= Aksuat (lake) =

Lake in the country of Kazakhstan

- Kazakh: Ақсуат; Russian: Аксуат
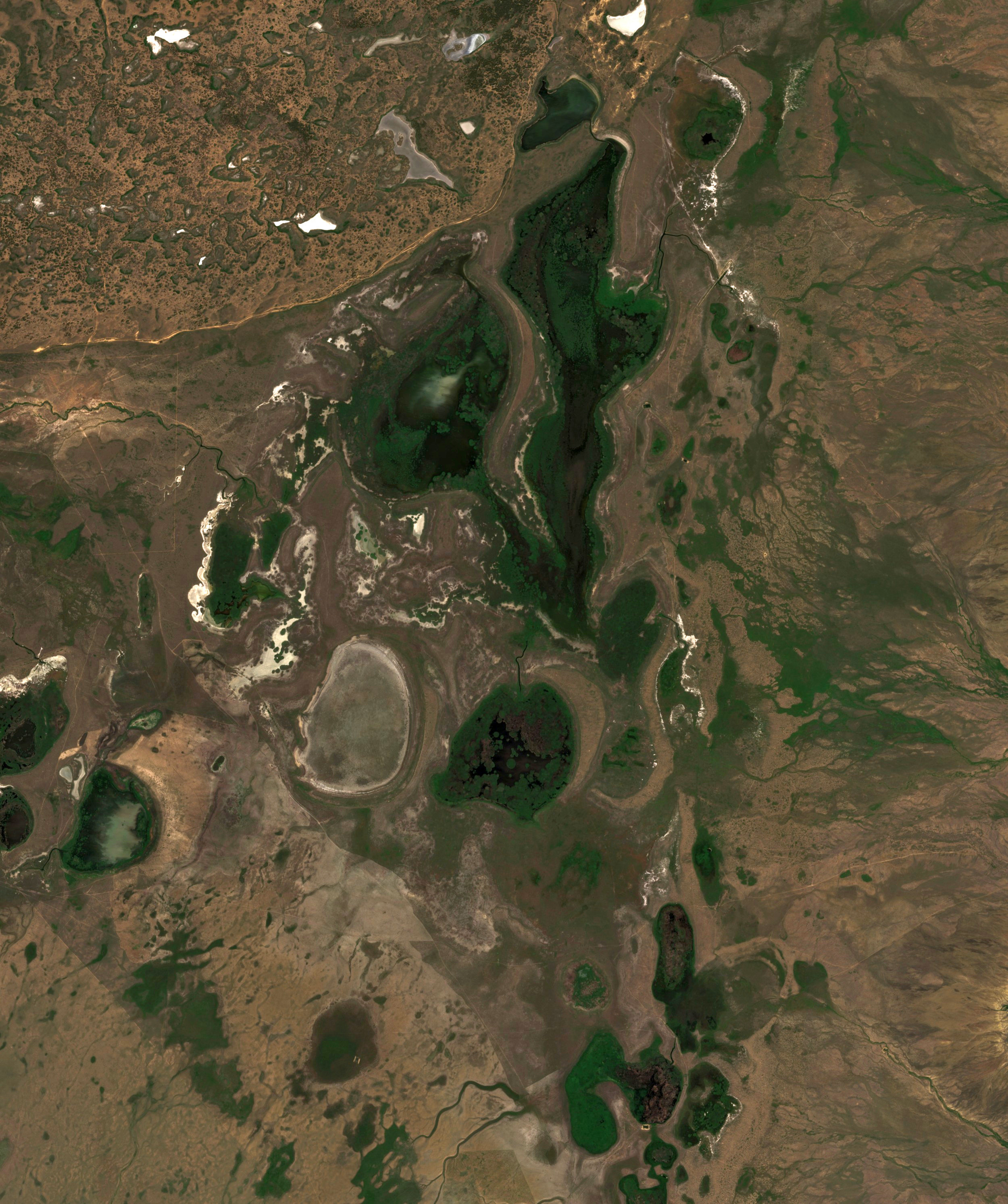
- Sentinel-2 image of the lake in 2022.

- Location within Kazakhstan
- Location: Turgay Basin
- Coordinates: 51°27′N 64°29′E
- Type: endorheic
- Primary inflows: Karasu
- Primary outflows: none
- Basin countries: Kazakhstan
- Max. length: 18.1 kilometers (11.2 mi)
- Max. width: 4.2 kilometers (2.6 mi)
- Surface area: 50 square kilometers (19 sq mi)
- Max. depth: 3 meters (9.8 ft)
- Shore length^{1}: 57 kilometers (35 mi)
- Surface elevation: 119 meters (390 ft)
- ^{1} Shore length is not a well-defined measure.

Aksuat (Kazakh: Ақсуат; Russian: Аксуат) is a brackish lake in Nauyrzym District, Kostanay Region, Kazakhstan.

Aksuat is a steppe lake of the central sector of the Turgay Basin in Nauyrzym District, Kostanay Region. Now uninhabited Naurzum village is located near the lake and the Naurzum Nature Reserve protected area is named after it. Karamendy, the administrative center of the district, is located about 30 kilometers (19 mi) to the northwest and Shili village 15 kilometers (9.3 mi) to the northeast of the northern end of the lake.

== Geography ==
Aksuat is an endorheic lake lying in the Ishim river valley, between Zharman lake to the north and Sarykopa farther to the south. It is a shallow and elongated lake system, stretching roughly from SSW to NNE and consisting of two main lakes, the Small Aksuat and the Big Aksuat which are connected by a 700 meters (2,300 ft) long channel. The Karasu river flows into the lake from the southwest. In years of heavy snowfall the lake may reach a surface area of 220 square kilometers (85 sq mi) in the spring, but during the dry season in the summer the lake usually splits into a number of smaller, very shallow lakes. In years of drought Aksuat may dry completely up.

The lake freezes in November and its ice begins to melt in April. The banks are indented and the bottom of the lake is muddy. The water has a high concentration of minerals.

== Fauna ==
Aksuat is part of the Naurzum Nature Reserve. It can support large concentrations of waterbirds such as the white-tailed lapwing, common goldeneye and squacco heron. There have been sightings of the critically endangered siberian crane, but few. Among the fish species found in the lake, perch, common roach and carp deserve mention.

== See also ==
- List of lakes of Kazakhstan
