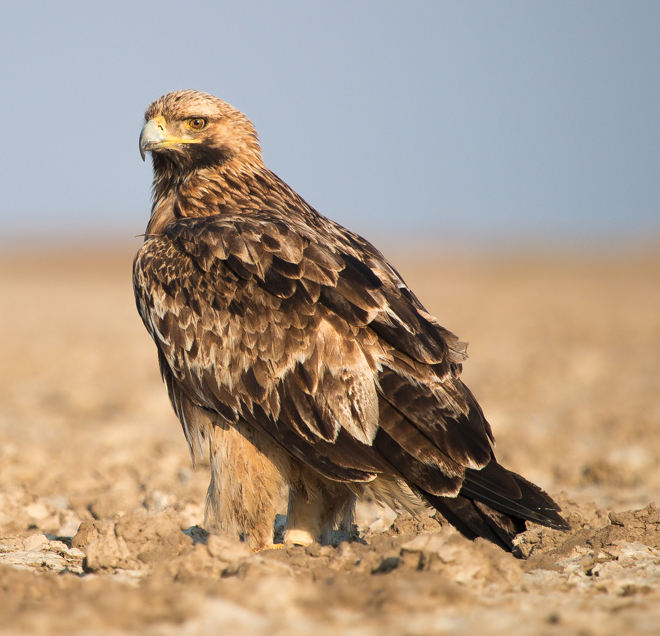
- Subadult of typical transitional plumage at the Little Rann of Kutch

Conservation status
- Vulnerable (IUCN 3.1)
- CITES Appendix I

Scientific classification
- Kingdom: Animalia
- Phylum: Chordata
- Class: Aves
- Order: Accipitriformes
- Family: Accipitridae
- Genus: Aquila
- Species: A. heliaca

Binomial name
- Aquila heliaca Savigny, 1809
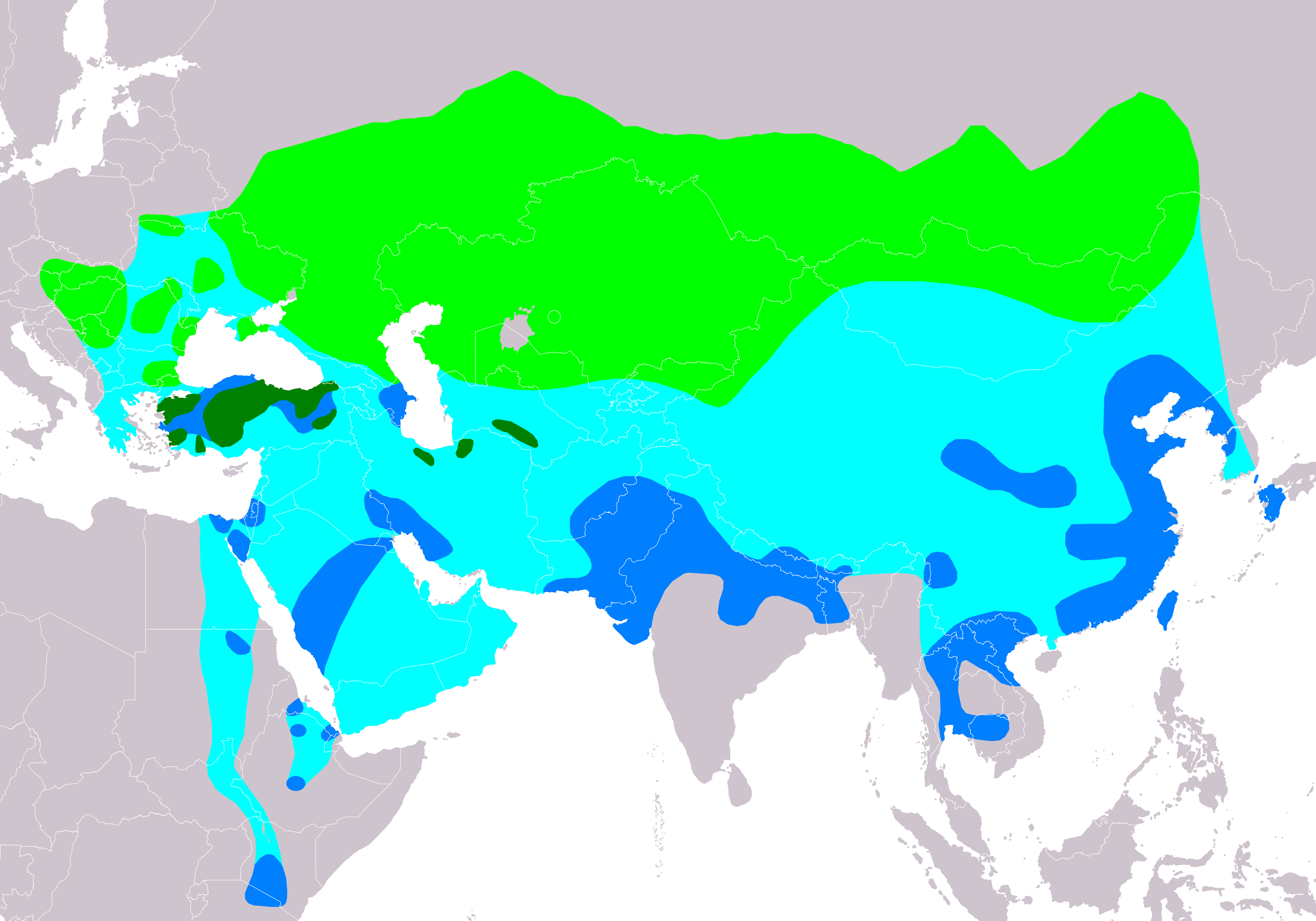
- Distribution of Aquila heliaca: Breeding Resident Passage Non-breeding

Synonyms
- Aquila heliaca heliaca

= Eastern imperial eagle =

Species of bird

The eastern imperial eagle (Aquila heliaca) is a large bird of prey that breeds in southeastern Europe and extensively through West and Central Asia. Most populations are migratory and winter in northeastern Africa, the Middle East and South and East Asia. Like all eagles, the eastern imperial eagle is a member of the family Accipitridae. Furthermore, its feathered legs mark it as a member of the subfamily Aquilinae. It is a large, dark-colored eagle, with a resemblance to other members of the genus Aquila, but it is usually the darkest species in its range. It is an opportunistic predator that mostly selects smallish mammals as prey but also a fairly large proportion of birds, reptile and other prey types, including carrion. Compared to other Aquila eagles, it has a strong preference for the interface of tall woods with plains and other open, relatively flat habitats, including the wooded mosaics of the steppe. Normally, nests are located in large, mature trees and the parents raise around one or two fledglings. The global population is small and declining due to persecution, loss of habitat and prey. It has therefore been IUCN Red Listed as Vulnerable since 1994.

== Taxonomy ==
The eastern imperial eagle is a member of the Aquilinae or booted eagles, a rather monophyletic subfamily of the accipitrid family. At least 38 species are currently housed in the subfamily, all with signature well-feathered tarsi. This species is a member of the genus Aquila, which are mostly large, fairly dark colored eagles distributed largely through the more open habitats of Eurasia and Africa (with one in North America and a couple in Australasia). Studies on DNA have indicated that the imperial eagle is part of a subgroup with other moderately sized Aquila such as the steppe eagle (Aquila nipalensis) and the tawny eagle (Aquila rapax). Despite the outward resemblance to the imperial eagle, the 4 species in the golden eagle subgroup appear to be rather more closely related to the dissimilarly smallish and pale-bellied sister species, African hawk eagle (Aquila spilogaster) and Bonelli's eagle (Aquila fasicata). The Spanish imperial eagle, which is found in Spain and Portugal, was formerly lumped with this species, the name imperial eagle having been previously used in both circumstances. However, the two are now regarded as separate species due to significant differences in morphology, ecology and molecular characteristics. It is likely that the eastern imperial eagle is the paraspecies for the Spanish imperial eagle and that the imperial eagle complex reached the Iberian peninsula sometimes between the late Pleistocene era and early Holocene. The Spanish imperial eagle may be considered an ice age relict due to its isolation.

== Description ==
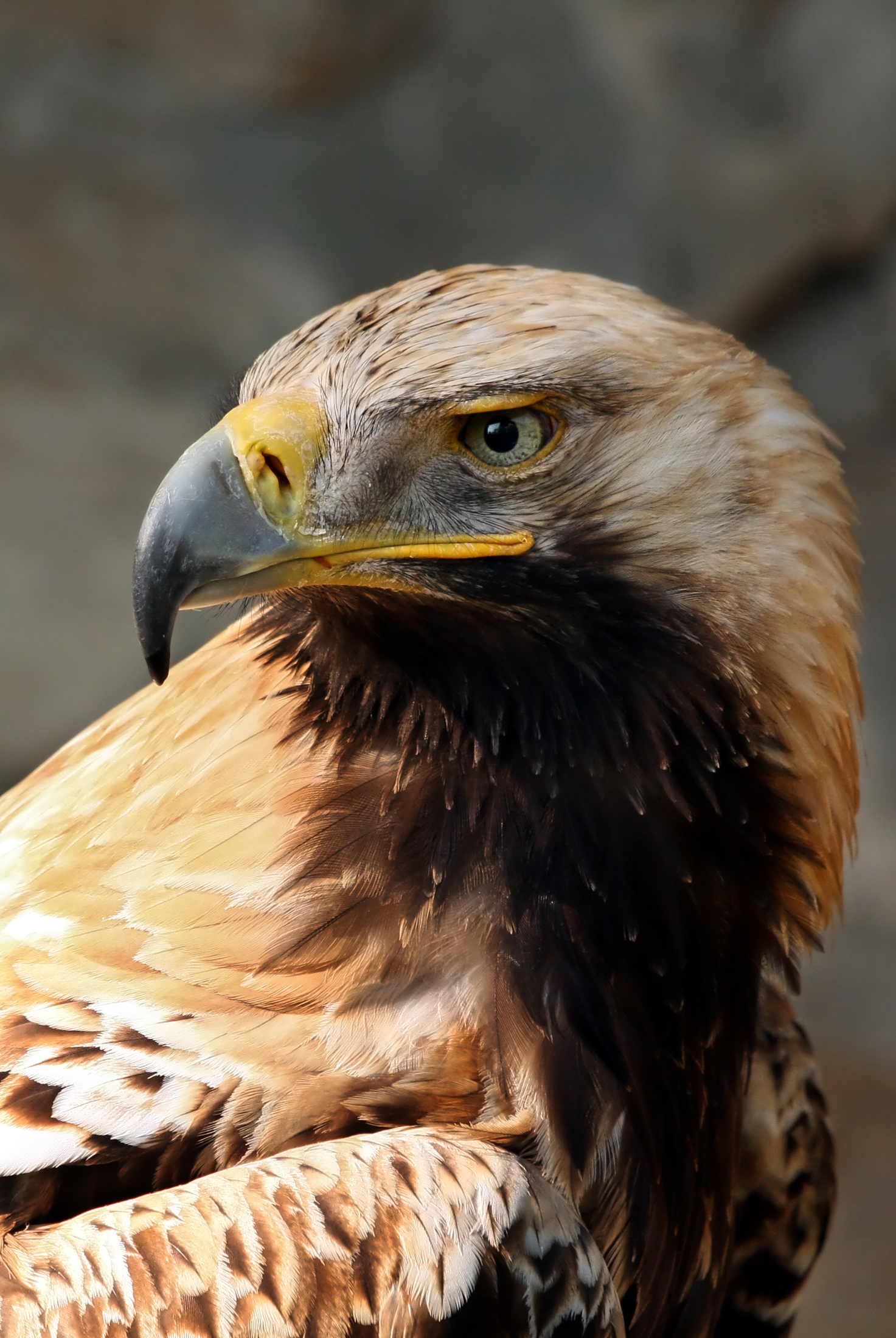
Closeup of an adult imperial eagle.

The eastern imperial eagle is a large eagle, but usually falls near the average size of the large-bodied genus Aquila. Adult total length can range from 68 to 90 cm (27 to 35 in) with a typical wingspan of 1.76 to 2.2 m (5 ft 9 in to 7 ft 3 in). The average wingspan of a small sample showed males to average 1.95 m (6 ft 5 in) while a small sample of females averaged 2.07 m (6 ft 9 in). Although otherwise outwardly similar, the species displays reverse sexual dimorphism as do most birds of prey, in which males are usually smaller than the females. For the eastern imperial eagle, females are up to 10% larger linearly and 40% heavier in body mass in some cases. In terms of body mass, one survey found five males to weigh from 2.45 to 2.72 kg (5.4 to 6.0 lb) and five females to weigh from 3.26 to 4.54 kg (7.2 to 10.0 lb). The average weight of this sample of imperial eagles was reportedly 2.62 kg (5.8 lb) in the males and 3.9 kg (8.6 lb) in the females. A sample of unknown size showed males to weigh an average 2.88 kg (6.3 lb) while females reportedly weighed an average of 3.38 kg (7.5 lb). A further two mature females weighed an average of 3.56 kg (7.8 lb). Among standard measurements, males may range in wing chord length from 540 to 622 mm (21.3 to 24.5 in), in tail length from 260 to 308 mm (10.2 to 12.1 in) and in tarsus length from 91 to 98 mm (3.6 to 3.9 in). Meanwhile, females may range in wing chord length from 565 to 665 mm (22.2 to 26.2 in), in tail length from 270 to 330 mm (11 to 13 in) and in tarsus length from 97 to 107 mm (3.8 to 4.2 in). A sample of imperial eagles ranged in total bill length from 65.7 to 76.5 mm (2.59 to 3.01 in).

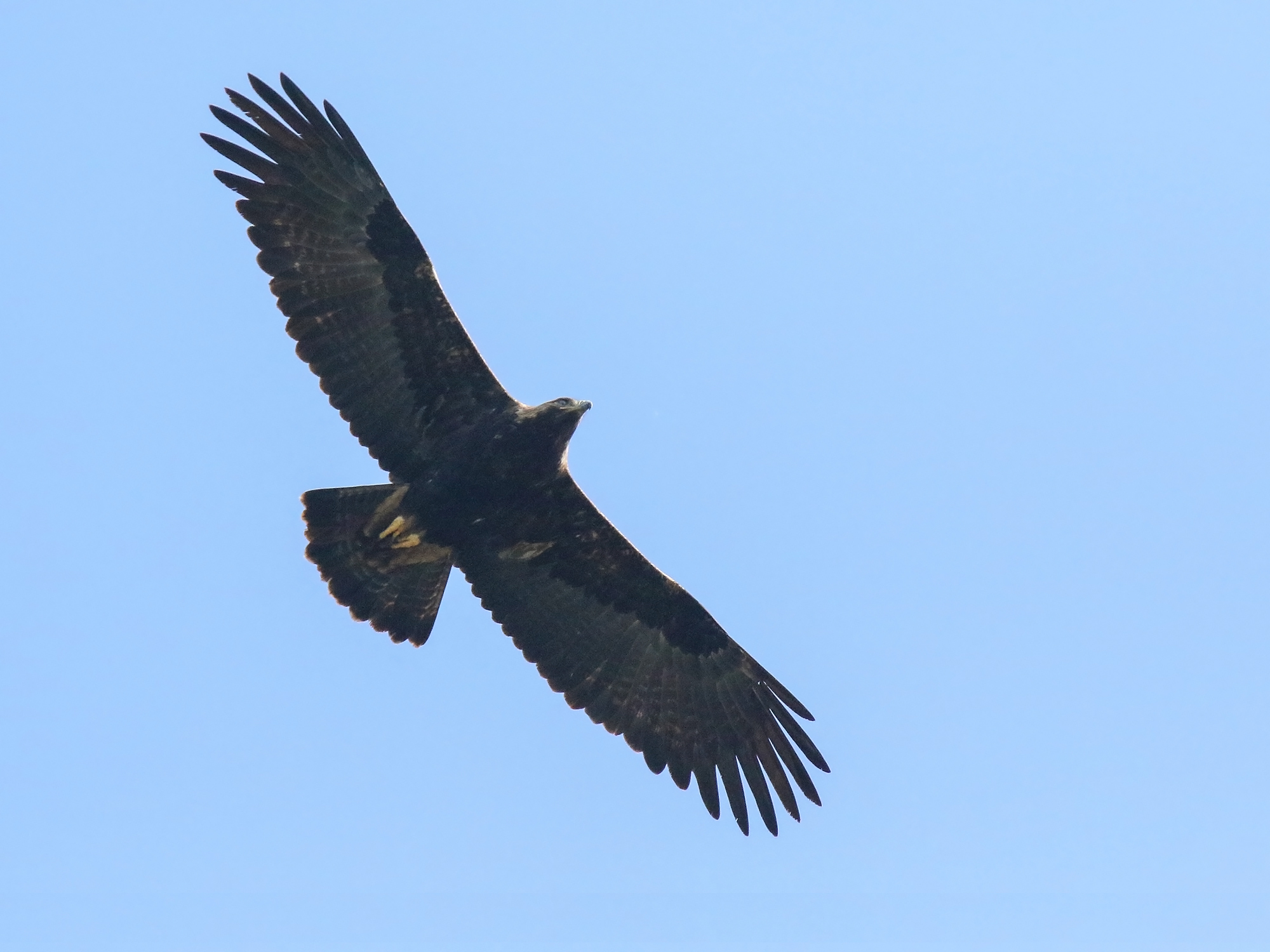
An eastern imperial eagle, probably an older subadult, in flight showing their characteristic flat, relatively narrow wings.

In general, compared to other species in their taxonomic group, the eastern imperial eagle has a relatively long and thick neck, a big head and bill (with a gape line level with middle of eye), a longish square tipped tail, somewhat long and well-feathered legs and strong feet. The species tends to perch in a fairly upright position often on rather exposed tree branch or low mound, rock, haystack or similar convenient site. For an Aquila eagle, it is seemingly relatively less shy and bolder in the presence of humans. The adult plumage is largely a tar-like blackish-brown but for a well-demarcated and highly contrasting creamy to golden buff colour about the crown, hindneck and neck sides. Furthermore, adults have bold white "epaulettes" on their shoulder braces, which are usually fairly conspicuous on perched birds. The adult's tail is narrowly dark barred over a greyish ground colour and has a broad black subterminal band, while a white tail tip sometimes manifest in adults that are freshly molted. The undertail coverts are sometimes indistinctly paler, rust to creamy, combined with grey tail base to give the appearance of a paler rear end. At rest, the wing tips tend to reach the tail tip. The juvenile eastern imperial eagle is mostly pale tawny-buff to sandy yellow with fairly heavy dark brown streaks from the throat down to the breast, mantle, scapulars and forewing coverts. The juvenile's scapulars and forewing coverts also have sometimes noticeable white tipped feathers while the median coverts are perceptibly browner and greater coverts blackish both with broad creamy-yellow tips forming clear wing bars. The flight feathers and tail on juveniles are often blackish and tipped whitish, however the white parts on the lower back to tail coverts are only lightly streaked in the centre and often not visible when perched. Below the streaked breast, the remainder of the juvenile's underparts are plain pale buff. By the 2nd year, the brown streaking on the underside fades to a plainer sandy hue and the pale bars also start to fade on wings. Especially later into the 2nd year into the 3rd year, some young eastern imperial-eagles show an erratic blotching of blackish-brown feathers below. By about the 4th winter, as the birds enter their subadult plumage, the forefront of the eagle is often a rather patchy mix of sandy and darker adult-like feathers. During slow annual molts, the dark feathers expand initially from the throat and upper breast outward. Late into the subadult stage, the birds also start to develop a pale crown and nape but usually the rear body still more juvenile-like, such as the pale rump-band and crissum despite the otherwise darkening tail and wing feathers. The full adult plumage is attained at 5–6 years of age but some subadults are already breeding before this.

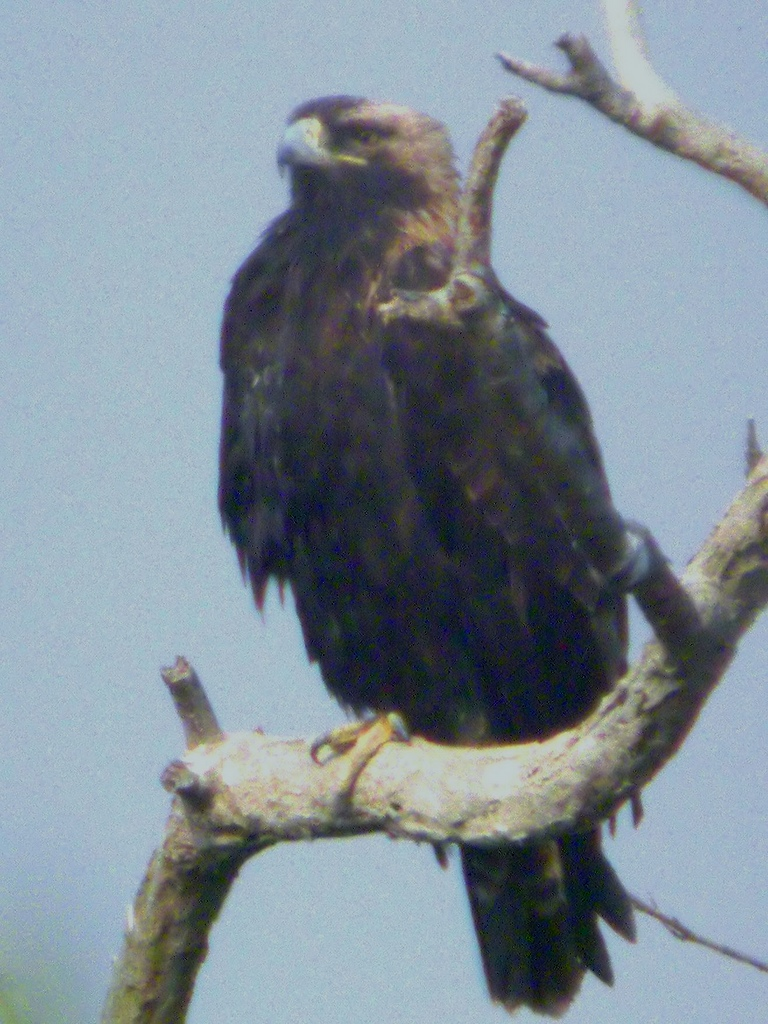
An adult imperial eagle in Hong Kong.

In flight, the eastern imperial eagle is a large raptor that has for an Aquila a very projecting neck and "huge" head and bill. The long wings may appear fairly broad when compared to other, smaller raptors, but are relatively narrow with even parallel edges when compared to other Aquila eagles. Their flight style is relatively heavy but steady with deep powerful beats but they are not uncommonly clumsy at first takeoff. They tend to soar with forward pressed but rather flat wings, the outer wing feathers may sometimes curve up but as a rule they do not fly with a V as do some other Aquila. The species may also hold their wings flat while engaging in a glide but as it accelerates they may arch wings back. In flight, the adult from above shows dark brown with small white braces, greyish tail with fine dark bars and a very broad, blackish subterminal band. The adult is essentially all dark colored when seen from below relieved only by some very dusky grey flight feathers on the primaries (against the black wing tips), a grey crissum and thinly barred grey tail base. However, these features may be only obvious in good light and at reasonable distances. In flight, the juvenile is largely pale buff with brown streaking. The lower back, rump, tail coverts and leg feathers are all whitish cream in colour which contrasts noticeably with their white-tipped blackish greater coverts, primary coverts and quills. On their mantle, juveniles manifest two white wing bars above and a narrow whitish lower trailing edge. Meanwhile, the juvenile's inner primaries are much paler creamy-buff hue than their other flight feathers. The dusky brown wing linings of the juvenile plumage, when compared to the darker ones of adults, show more extensive coarse patterning. Some birds by 2nd to 3rd year are so worn in their flight feathers as to appear almost unstreaked sandy while, from the 3rd year on, darker feathers start to appear below with various untidy variations.

=== Confusion of species ===
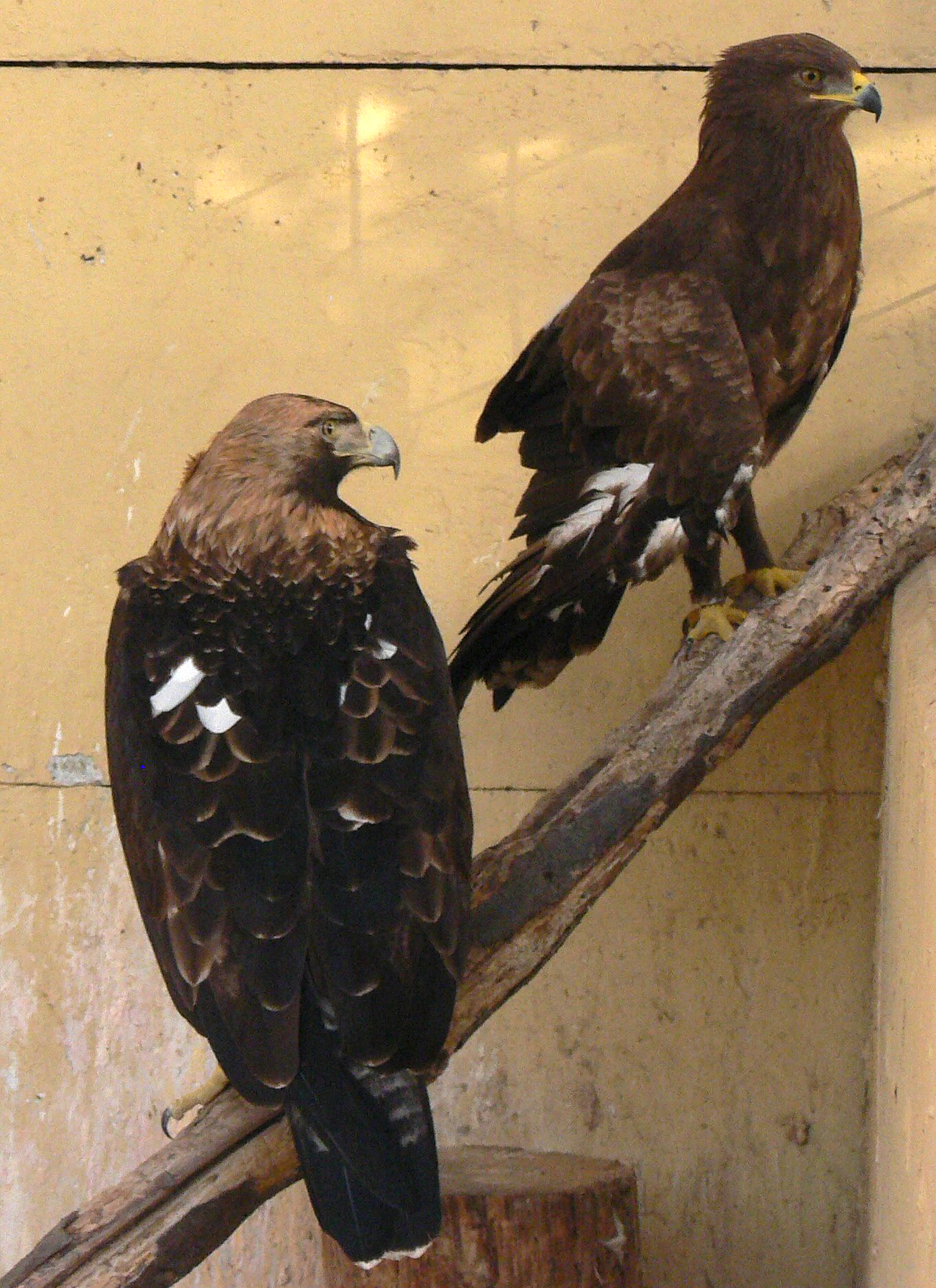
A captive adult eastern imperial eagle sharing an aviary with a smaller cousin, the lesser spotted eagle.

The eastern imperial eagle is typically smaller, being more slender and less bulky and powerful in appearance despite its proportionately larger head and longer neck, than the golden eagle (Aquila chrysaetos). In some parts of the range, the female imperial eagle probably averages similar size and body mass to the smaller male golden eagle. However, apparently the species can be reliably distinguished by the size of its hallux claw (the enlarged rear talon that accipitrids used as a killing apparatus) which is consistently larger in the golden species. Two female eastern imperial eagles measured 38 and 43 mm (1.5 and 1.7 in) in hallux claw length while a male was about 35.5 mm (1.40 in), whereas the smallest talon measured for an immature male American golden eagle was 44.9 mm (1.77 in). Nonetheless, besides its wider ranging golden cousin, this species is typically the largest, with the largest extremities (i.e. tarsal, tail and bill length) and most powerful booted eagle species in the majority of its range (apart from its rare African winter range) when compared to similar eagles such as others in the genera Aquila and Clanga. In their winter quarters in South Asia, this species rivals a fish eagle as the largest and most dominant eagle species. Usually, the plumage of the adult eastern imperial eagle is very distinctive. It is considerably darker than other adult Aquila eagles in central Eurasia. Furthermore, all other Eurasian eagles in their range lack the white spots on the wing mantle and greyish under-tail. Given reasonable views, the juvenile imperial eagle is no less distinctive, with its unique tawny-buff covered in brownish streaking, a colour combination not seen in other species. From a distance, the juvenile may give the impression of a dark mantle and chest band with very pale rear body and a blackish tail and remiges against strikingly pale primary wedges. Adults do however strongly resemble their considerably extralimital cousins, the Spanish imperial eagle, but the eastern species has more restricted white on the shoulder and has a slightly more brownish hue in the dark underside feathers, while juvenile Spanish imperials are richly tawny in colour rather than pale buffy and lack brownish streaking on the body. The Spanish species is similar in size and proportions to the eastern imperial but is marginally heavier on average and has an even more protruding head and neck.

The subadult eastern imperial eagle may be confused with older immature greater spotted eagles (Clanga clanga) but the latter is less contrastingly patterned, without a paler shawl and has greater covert band below (despite the rare hint of one on some imperials) and densely bared flight feathers. Adult greater spotted eagles have similar underwing contrast as juvenile eastern imperial eagles but, beyond plumage characteristics, are distinct for their much smaller head, slightly smaller overall size and more compact frame with a relatively broader and shorter wings. More similar to the juvenile eastern imperial eagle is the fulvescens morph of the greater spotted eagle which is fairly rare (more so in the west) but is similarly or even as pale buffy. However this spotted eagle morph lacks the brownish streaks below of the juvenile imperial and further has contrasting much darker feathering on the wing coverts (heavily spotted in juvenile greater spotted eagles) and mantle as well as sometimes the facial feathers, and can further be distinguished by the same aforementioned differences in form. Indian spotted eagles (Clanga hastata) tend to show paler lesser under-wing coverts like juvenile eastern imperial eagles but are considerably smaller and differ in all other proportions and plumage features. Although at times described as "very similar", the eastern imperial eagles are fairly easily told from the golden eagle by being much darker with less broad wings that are held much flatter. The golden eagle, unlike imperial eagles, tends to fly with its wings pointed upwards and have a gradual tapering wing shape (somewhat narrower at the base, broader at the primaries). In golden eagles, the tail generally appears narrower and squarer in shape. At closer range, the pale area on the back of the head and neck in eastern imperial eagle may be suggestive to some of the golden eagle's golden nape but is always much paler and chalkier in colour, as well as more strongly contrasted by the otherwise dark feathers and is more extensive. Against the somewhat similarly sized but more compact juvenile steppe eagle (Aquila nipalensis), the juvenile eastern imperial eagle does not show a white band on underwing like the steppe. More obviously, the steppe eagle lacks the paler overall colours and contrasting brownish streaking of juvenile imperials. Feather wear can make the wing shape of the two resemble the other but the larger head and less compact frame of the imperial species render its flight profile distinctive. The only darker large booted eagle encountered by the eastern imperial eagle, in its African winter quarters, is the jet-black Verreaux's eagle (Aquila verreauxii) which is more suggestive in size and proportions of the golden eagle. An unlikely source of confusion, the Verreaux's differs in almost all plumage characteristics and has far more tapered wings that pinch in at the base and, like the golden eagle, tends to fly in a fairly strong dihedral. In Asia, its proportions and size may be suggestive of the perhaps even rarer Pallas's fish eagle (Haliaeetus leucoryphus) and the two can potentially be mistaken in strongly backlit conditions which obscure their obviously distinct plumages. The large headed and flat winged shape of the imperial eagle may too suggest in silhouette the white-tailed eagle (Haliaeetus albicilla) but that species is usually rather larger bodied and even larger headed with much broader wings and a proportionately shorter tail. Cinereous vulture (Aegypius monachus), being similarly dusky overall below, have been suggested as confusion species, but are much larger than imperial eagles with differing proportions (far broader wings, proportionately smaller head and shorter tail) and lack any of the contrasting pale parts of the imperial eagle's plumage.

=== Vocalizations ===
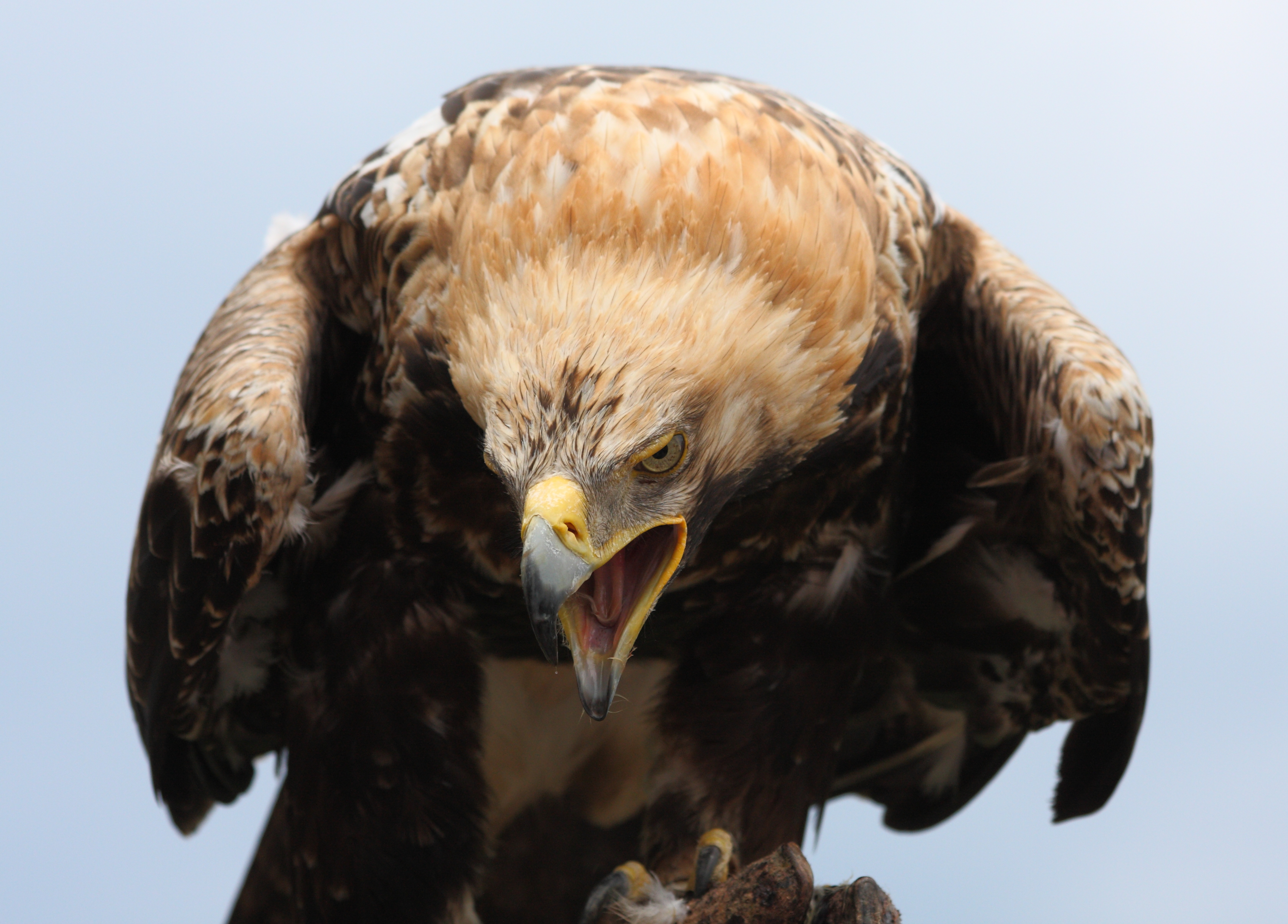
A probable older subadult eastern imperial eagle in a captive falconry centre.

The eastern imperial eagle is quite vocal on their breeding ground but tends to be silent or nearly so elsewhere. The main call of the species is a deep, harsh bark owk owk, gok gok or kraw-kraw. The call tends to be repeated rapidly up to 8-10 times. Their call is perceptibly deeper and harsher than that of the golden eagle, somewhat incongruously also being more resonant and commanding. Sometimes when extending to a prolonged version, its call is sometimes considered reminiscent of the croak of a large frog. The eastern imperial eagle most frequently calls during their aerial displays. In extreme cases, the call may be repeated up to 13 times during an aerial display. Furthermore, they may repeat the call from a perch. Females may also call when a male arrives with prey. Alarm calls recorded for the species include a soft ko-gok, wk wk wk, uttered in response to a distant intruder, a closer approach also may cause a harder gek call by the mother. A rising and falling trill has been additionally recorded in captivity is also probably an alarm call.

== Distribution and habitat ==
=== Breeding range ===
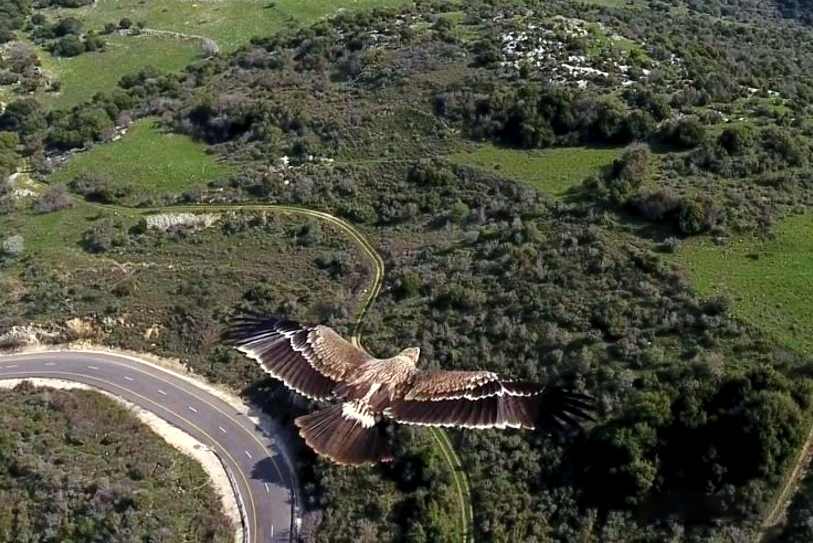
A juvenile photographed from helicopter. Eastern imperial eagles prefer the interface of woods and open areas and can tolerate agriculture and development so long as prey sources remain.

The eastern imperial eagle occurs in east-central and southeastern Europe, with its breeding range including eastern Austria, eastern Czech Republic, Slovakia, Hungary, eastern Croatia, Serbia, northeastern Bosnia and Herzegovina, Macedonia, Bulgaria, Romania, Moldova and northern, western and much of the eastern part of Ukraine. Its range continues across central Russia, where it lives through most of the Central Federal District, essentially all of the North Caucasian Federal District, most of the Volga and Ural Federal Districts and the southern Siberia past Lake Baikal to the Zabaykalsky Krai in the southwest of the Russian Far East. Outside Russia, its breeding range extends south to mostly the northern portions of Georgia, Armenia, Azerbaijan, Turkmenistan, Uzbekistan, much of Kazakhstan, northwestern China and northern Mongolia. Isolated populations also persist in Cyprus, northwestern, central and eastern Turkey, and northern Iran. It is probably locally extinct in Afghanistan and Pakistan.

=== Migration and wintering range ===
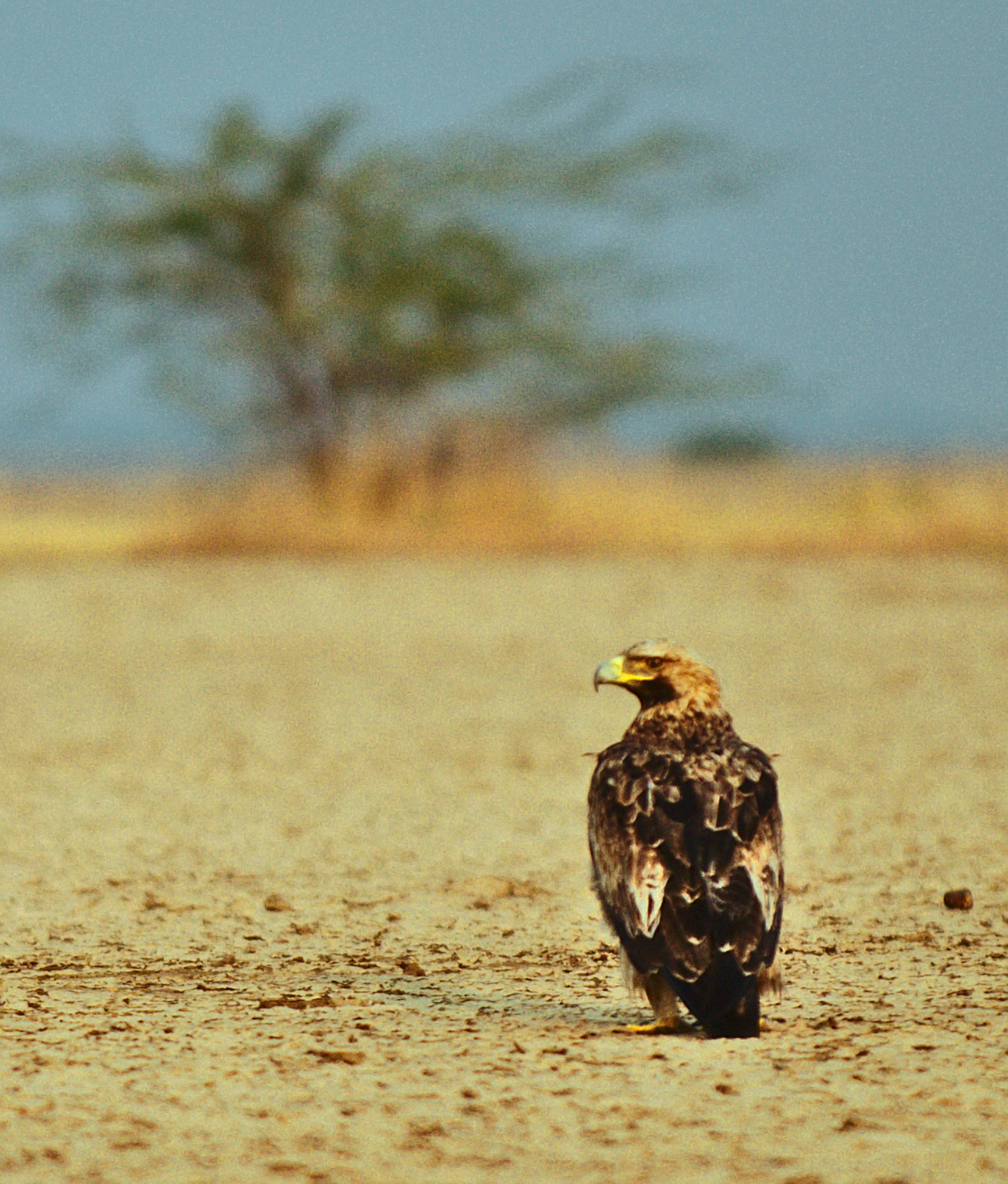
Eastern imperial eagle wintering in Little Rann of Kutch, Gujarat, India

The eastern imperial eagle is migratory in most of its range, though a variable amount of residency or very local wandering during winter in the western and southern parts of its range may lend it to be described as a partial migrant. It has been recorded overwintering as far north as Mongolia. In Bulgaria, of three post-dispersal juveniles, two remained within the country and only one migrated a long distance to Israel. Migratory movements occur during fall any time from September to November and in spring anytime from February to May, shifting earlier in the fall and later in spring the farther north that the eagles breed. Differentiating the large areas used merely for passage migration or vagrancy from regular wintering grounds can be difficult. Though typically seen in very small numbers at main raptor migration sites, the species may occur as a passage migrant through much of the Middle East down to Yemen, with pockets of wintering eagles in Israel, northern Jordan, central Saudi Arabia, Kuwait, northeastern Iraq and adjacent southwestern Iran. A radio-tagging study of a few wintering eagles in Arabia found they returned variously to Russia in four cases and Kazakhstan and China in a single case, with a range of ground covered in spring migration of 3,900 to 5,000 km (2,400 to 3,100 mi). The eastern imperial eagle winters locally and in quite small numbers in Africa's Nile valley, mostly being reported in southern Sudan, central Ethiopia and northern Kenya, irregularly down as far as southern Kenya and once even in northern Tanzania. Most migrants to Africa apparently originate in the western part of the breeding range such as Europe. Further east, such as the imperial eagles that breed around Lake Baikal, will generally migrate to south Asia. Moderate to quite low numbers of this species are usually noted at migration sites in the Himalayas. The eastern imperial eagle winters fairly broadly in the Indian subcontinent, from eastern Pakistan, eastward through southern Nepal to Bangladesh and down as far south in India as the states of Gujarat, Madhya Pradesh, Bihar and northwestern Jharkhand. Other semi-regular wintering areas include southern Bhutan, Thailand and north Indochina (recorded across Chinese border in southwestern Yunnan) and spottily in east China where wildlands still occur. Occasionally, wintering birds are doing in central Cambodia and discontinuously in Laos and Vietnam, as well as in the Korean Peninsula, Taiwan and southern Japan (mostly Honshu). Vagrants have been reported in over 20 countries, mainly in Europe, including Poland, Sweden, Denmark, Germany and Italy.

=== Habitat ===
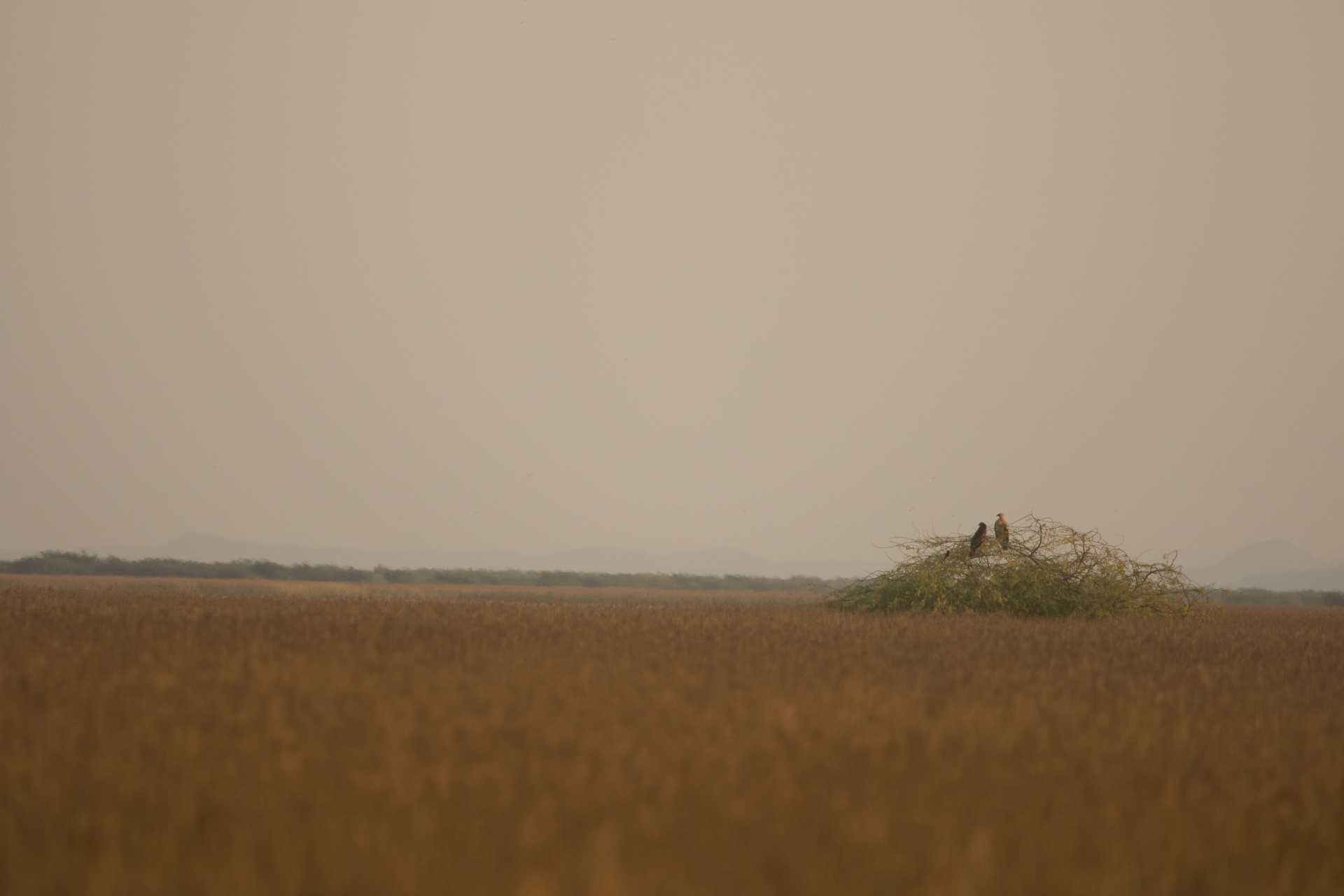
When wintering, eastern imperial eagles are partial to relatively open habitats.

The eastern imperial eagle is distributed as a breeding species largely along the southern edge of the vast taiga forests. The habitat preferred by the species is often rather open country with scattered trees or more enclosed woodlands, as well as around or near wetlands. The imperial eagle often forages mainly in open areas, extending to beyond typical assorted grasslands to wetlands and agricultural areas. In more extensive wooded areas, eastern imperial eagles require glades or meadows in order to executive hunting. The central part of their range as a breeding species occurs in vast areas of steppe and here the species often inhabits forest-steppe mosaics, as well as woodland edges, riparian zones and agricultural lands with trees or wooded patches. Lowland areas tend to be preferred, albeit not exclusively. In Turkestan and Kazakhstan, they may extend their breeding habitat into semi-desert. True desert is used during winter so long as foods are available. Largely where golden eagles are absent, the species has been reported to range into secondary habitats such as forested lower mountains and montane steppe and meadowland. In Europe at least, this is due to human pressures, which caused them to abandon open lowlands, timbered plains and river-fringed forests for forested, precipitous uplands. A slow repopulation of their preferred lowlands reported since the 1990s in Slovakia and Hungary. Often, eastern imperial eagles winter in more open habitats such as nearly continuous grassland, plains, semi-desert and cultivation with scattered trees as well as various marshes, lakes and other wetlands. The species resides mainly from sea level to 1,300 m (4,300 ft), locally to 1,800 m (5,900 ft), and has been recorded on passage at 3,900 m (12,800 ft) in Asia.

== Behaviour and ecology ==
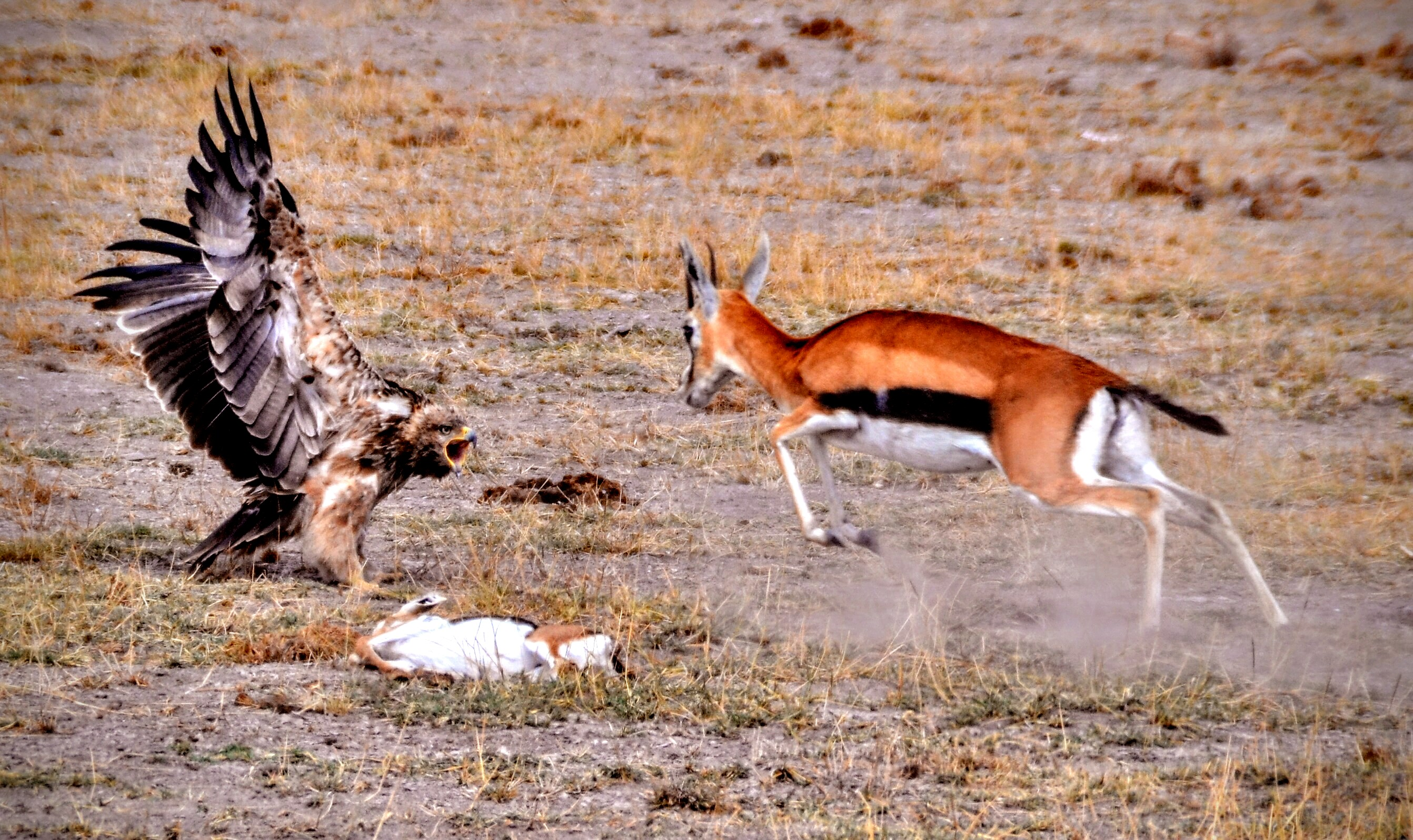
A juvenile imperial eagle facing off with a Thomson's gazelle mother over its dead calf

The eastern imperial eagle is somewhat varied in hunting techniques but almost exclusively takes its prey on the ground. It is possible some prey, such as fledgling birds, are taken from low perches in ambushes but this is seemingly unverified. They are also known to capture prey in water or from the edge of waterways and may even become waterlogged, especially when capturing water birds. Imperial eagles typically still hunt, watching for prey at length from a moderately low perch (usually a tree branch but virtually any perch from rocks to bushes to power poles), then often making a short stoop or dive to the ground once prey is spotted. Alternately, they may make a longer dive onto prey from a low soaring flight, often using any vegetation available to obscure their approach. Some prey are known to be captured on foot, including insects and ground squirrels, the latter reportedly by waiting by the entrance of the animal's burrow. Occasionally, this species pirates foods from other eagles and other birds of prey, especially during winter, and also tandem hunts in pairs as well. The eastern Imperial eagle is, like most active predators, an opportunist who exploits any prey they are capable of overpowering. Their prey spectrum is highly varied, including somewhere between 200 and 300 prey species, a total number of prey species only a bit short of the occasionally sympatric common buzzard (Buteo buteo) which may be 500 times more numerous overall. In the nations of Kazakhstan and Hungary alone, the total recorded prey spectrum is 154 and 126 species, respectively. Small to medium-sized mammals are the most regularly selected prey, with a preference for hares, various rodents, especially ground squirrels, hamsters and voles, as well as insectivores. Furthermore, various birds are taken, at times as much as or more so than mammals, especially the young or fledglings of various medium-sized to larger birds. Birds may locally become the primary foods in some parts of the winter range. Reptiles are taken secondarily in most of the range but can be locally somewhat important and fish and invertebrates, including insects, may be taken rarely.

The prey type historically most often associated with the eastern imperial eagle, at least in Europe, has been ground squirrels and hamsters. While these are significant, the primary prey type can vary and often hares or hedgehogs appear to take the primary position in recent studies. The largest European dietary study to date, a multi-year analysis from Hungary, showed that European hare (Lepus europaeus) were the primary foods, making up 27.4% of a total of 8,543 prey items. The second best represented prey in Hungary was the European hamster (Cricetus cricetus), at 12.71% of the diet. Similarly, in Slovakia and the Czech Republic, the European hare was the main prey, comprising 40.2% of 562 prey items and 41.3% of 109 prey items, respectively. The European hamster was the 4th most frequent prey in Slovakia but second most common prey species in the Czech Republic. As presented in the multi-year studies from Hungary, a seeming decline of the European ground squirrel (Spermophilus citellus) population is the cause of their reduced importance in the imperial eagle's diet, with this species being the primary prey in 1975–1991 (51% of 606 prey items from 1975 to 1985) to contributing almost nothing in 2005-2017. It is possible with reintroductions of the European ground squirrel underway in central Europe, that this prey species may again become more significant in the eastern imperial eagle's diet again here. In Tyva Republic, the long-tailed ground squirrel (Spermophilus undulatus) still dominates the food of imperial eagles, making up 60.1% of 168 prey items. In studies of two different areas of Bulgaria, one showed European hares as the main prey (25%) in the Dervent heights and southern white-breasted hedgehog (Erinaceus concolor) (32.5%) in the other, Saker mountain. In East Thrace, Turkey, the same hedgehog was the most important prey, comprising 23.1% of 582 prey items and 21.2% of the prey biomass.

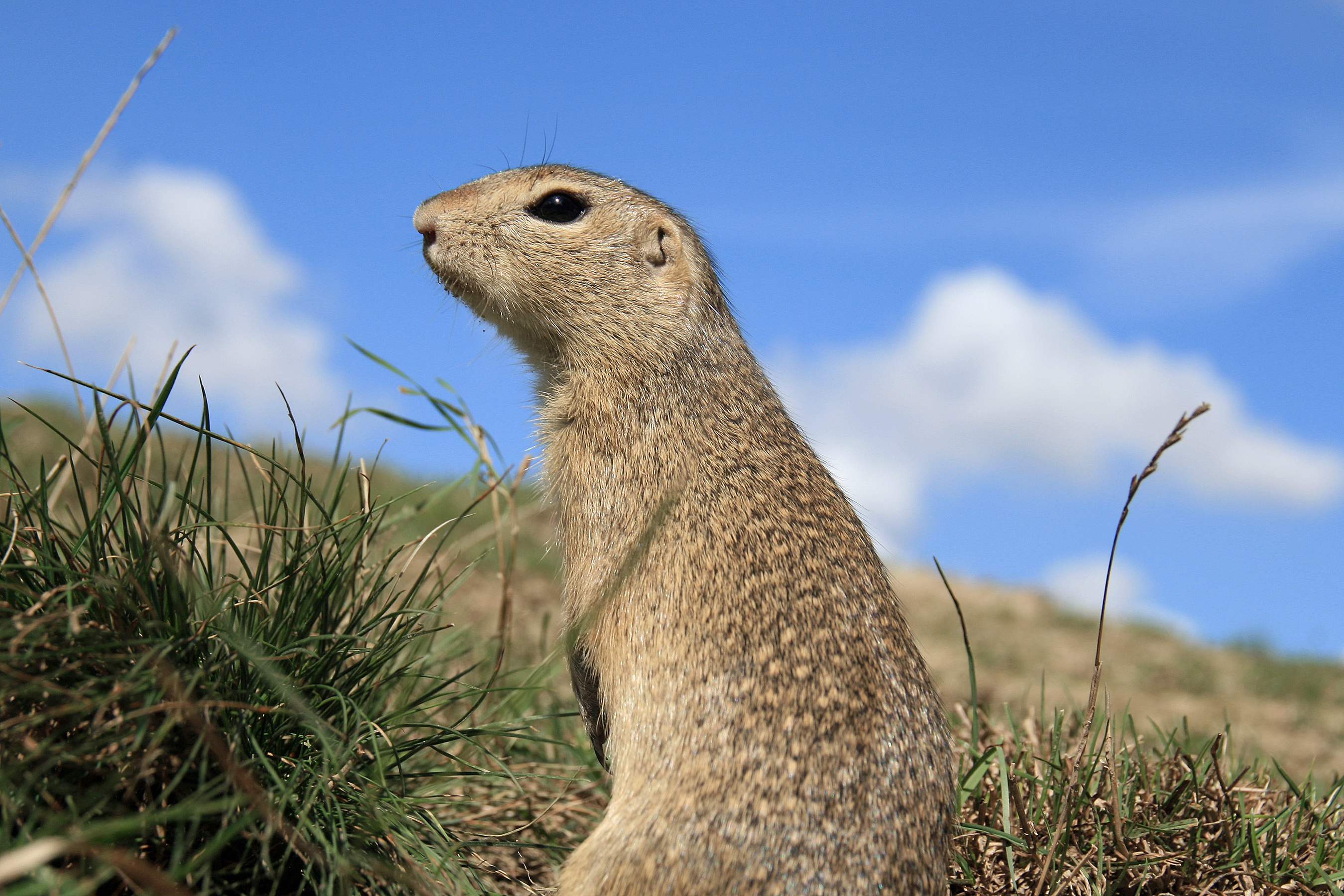
European ground squirrels are an important food source for eastern imperial eagles.

In warmer, southerly areas, the primary prey species seem to generally be smaller. In Georgia, social voles (Microtus socialis) were the primary food, comprising about 15% of 341 prey items. For wintering imperial eagles, the most frequent live prey (though carrion was mainly eaten) was Sundevall's jird (Meriones crassus). Both of these small rodents probably average only about 35 to 60 g (1.2 to 2.1 oz) in body mass. Numerous other small mammals may also be occasionally taken including several species each of hedgehogs, shrews and moles, beyond the common hare, at least 7 other species of lagomorphs, about a dozen species each of murid rodents and cricetid rodents (especially hamsters and voles), 5 species of zokor and assorted dormice and jerboas. Thus, eastern imperial eagles appear to prefer rodents and similar small mammals that are burrow-dwelling and/or partial to ground dwelling in open grass or fields along wooded edges.

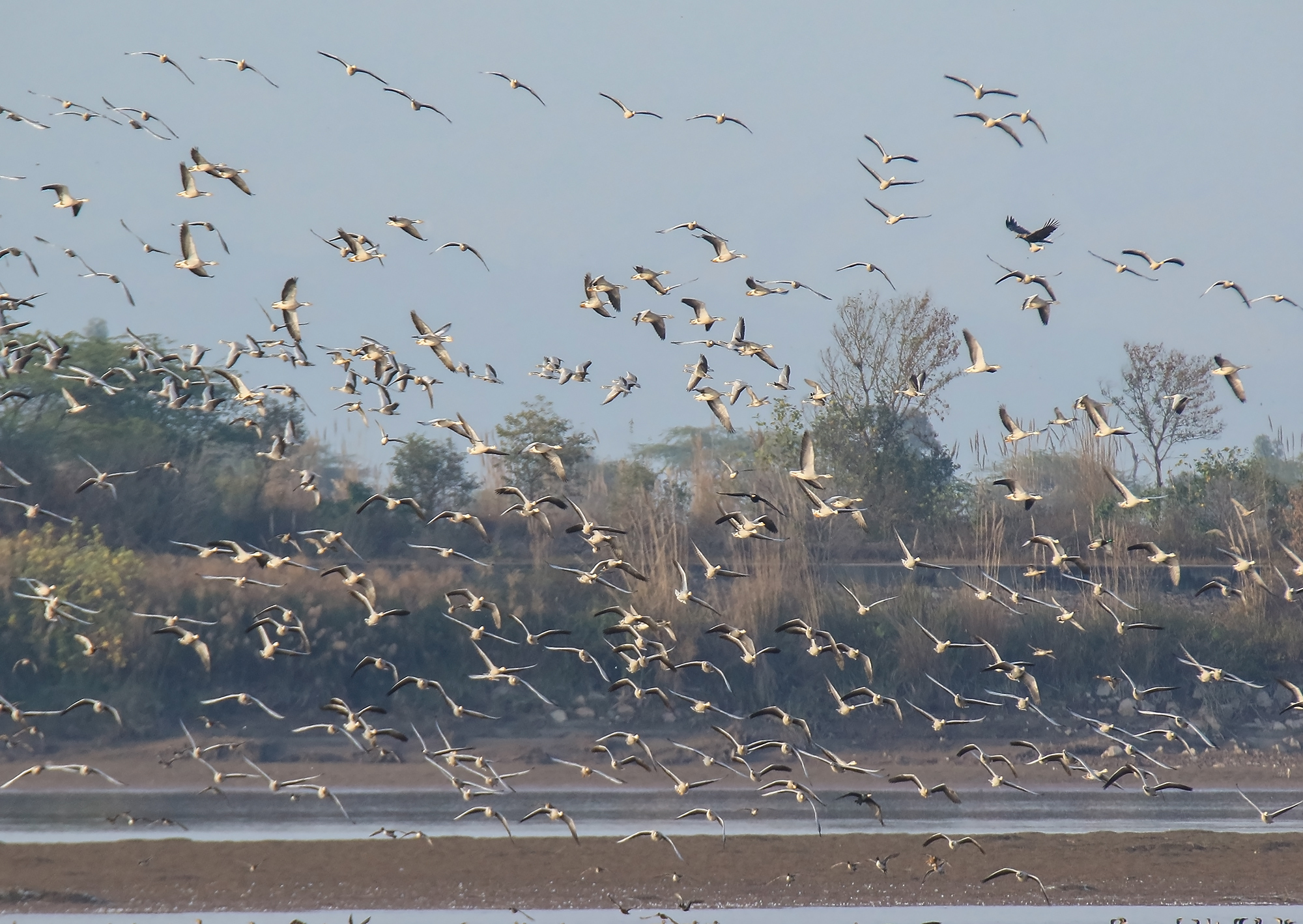
An eastern imperial eagle in the upper right side can be seen hunting flocks of bar-headed goose and northern pintail.

Assorted bird species may factor heavily into the diet of eastern imperial eagles. More than 120 bird species are known to be taken by this eagle. European studies reflect the high importance of common pheasants (Phasianus colchicus), in Europe a non-native gamebird (although the imperial eagle also encounters and hunts the species extensively in its native range as well), in their foods. In the aforementioned large Hungarian study, pheasants were the third most frequently taken prey species, making up 12% of the diet. In the Czech Republic, the pheasant ranked third as well. In Slovakia, the pheasant was second only to the hare in frequency, comprising 17.3% of the foods, although exclusively juvenile and hen pheasants (no cocks) were reportedly taken. In Bulgarian studies, the domestic chicken (Gallus gallus domesticus) seems to take the place of pheasants in their diet, making up 10.8% and 20.8% at Saker mountain and Dervent heights and second most frequently taken prey at both, respectively. The largest study of the eastern imperial eagle's dietary habits known occurred in the vast Naurzum Nature Reserve in Kazakhstan, where 11,079 prey items were reviewed. The prey spectrum was exceptionally diverse here, with no one prey reliably being favored by the imperial eagle pairs, despite an ample colony of yellow ground squirrel (Spermophilus fulvus) and russet ground squirrel (Spermophilus major) being nearby and at least three other species of eagles with nearby nesting sites presenting possible resource competition. Without presenting the metrics, apparently birds were the highest volume prey for the imperial eagles, especially corvids, namely the rook (Corvus frugilegus) and Eurasian magpie (Pica pica), numerous species of duck as well as Eurasian kestrels (Falco tinnunculus) and little bustards (Tetrax tetrax). In East Thrace, Turkey, the second most regularly taken prey species is the yellow-legged gull (Larus michahellis), which comprised more than 12% of the diet by number and 13.8% of the prey biomass. Additionally in East Thrace, a high volume of white storks (Ciconia ciconia) was taken, making up 11.3% of the biomass. In Bulgaria, similar prey were important secondary foods, i.e. Caspian gulls (Larus cachinnans) at 9.78% of the diet in the Saker mountain area, while white stork made up 10.42% of the diet at Dervent heights. A study of wintering eastern imperial eagles in the Bharatpur district of India showed that this species was generally more inactive but also more likely to capture its own food (rather than through scavenging or kleptoparasitism) than 4 assorted other eagle species in the area. Like other eagles here, the imperial eagles most often fed on various water birds, mainly the nestlings of late-nesting painted storks (Ciconia leucocephalus), black-headed ibis (Threskiornis melanocephalus), Oriental darters (Anhinga melanogaster) and a couple of species of cormorant. However, the imperial eagle in particularly here took to regularly hunting various adult water birds especially ducks, geese and large rails and had a mean daily food intake (not mean prey size) of 539 g (1.188 lb). In the Saurashtra region of India, imperial eagles were observed to show a preference for hunting diving water birds, including Eurasian coots (Fulica atra) and diving ducks, which they would hunt in a style reminiscent of the white-tailed eagle, forcing them to dive as they circled over the water and capturing them as they came to the water's surface to breathe. Numerous pigeons and doves may also be taken fairly often, such as in Slovakia where rock doves (Columba livia) were the 3rd most often regular prey at 11.79% of the diet. In general, a picture emerges of the imperial eagle's dietary preference for relatively large birds with conspicuous behaviour, relatively slow flight, who can be struck on or near the ground and/or have vulnerable nesting sites or conspicuous young, such as gamebirds, waterfowl, other water birds and corvids.

European studies of the eastern imperial eagle's diet rarely reflect prey outside of the main preferred classes of mammals and birds, however studies from somewhat outside Europe show respectable numbers of reptiles may be taken. In Georgia, reptiles amounted to 29.62% of the food, comprised largely either of Caucasian agama (Paralaudakia caucasia) or other unidentified smallish lizards. A larger class of reptiles were regular secondary prey in East Thrace in Turkey, namely Greek tortoise (Testudo graeca) and Hermann's tortoise (Testudo hermanni), with tortoises altogether comprising 11.1% of the diet by number and 13.7% of the prey biomass. Tortoises, along with lizards such as spiny-tailed lizards (Uromastix hardwickii) and monitor lizards (Varanus spp.) can be significant in the diet elsewhere as well, especially in more arid climes. Although snakes do not seem to be typically quantitatively important, eastern imperial eagles have no problem occasionally subduing large snakes, such as Aesculapian snakes (Zamenis longissimus), or very aggressive venomous snakes, such as Russell's viper (Daboia russelii) (the latter taken in their wintering Indian quarters). In Hungary, very small numbers of invertebrates (mostly insects such as ground beetles) and fish were found amongst the foods of imperial eagles. Carrion is eaten through the year by eastern imperial eagles, but most heavily during winter. For example, in the wintering population of Jordan, 53.7% of the dietary intake of the species was made up of carrion. However, in some breeding populations, apparently the eagles can come to rely on dead or already injured prey inadvertently provided by humans, largely due to intensive agricultural practices, as was the case in the Czech Republic. In one area of Slovakia, although imperial eagles also hunted, the adult eagles routinely practiced kleptoparasitism while nesting, regularly robbing other species of raptorial bird of their fresh catches. Almost any mammal or bird will be readily eaten when dead or dying by imperial eagles, with at least 10 species of ungulate known to be consumed thusly and providing an ample source of meat.

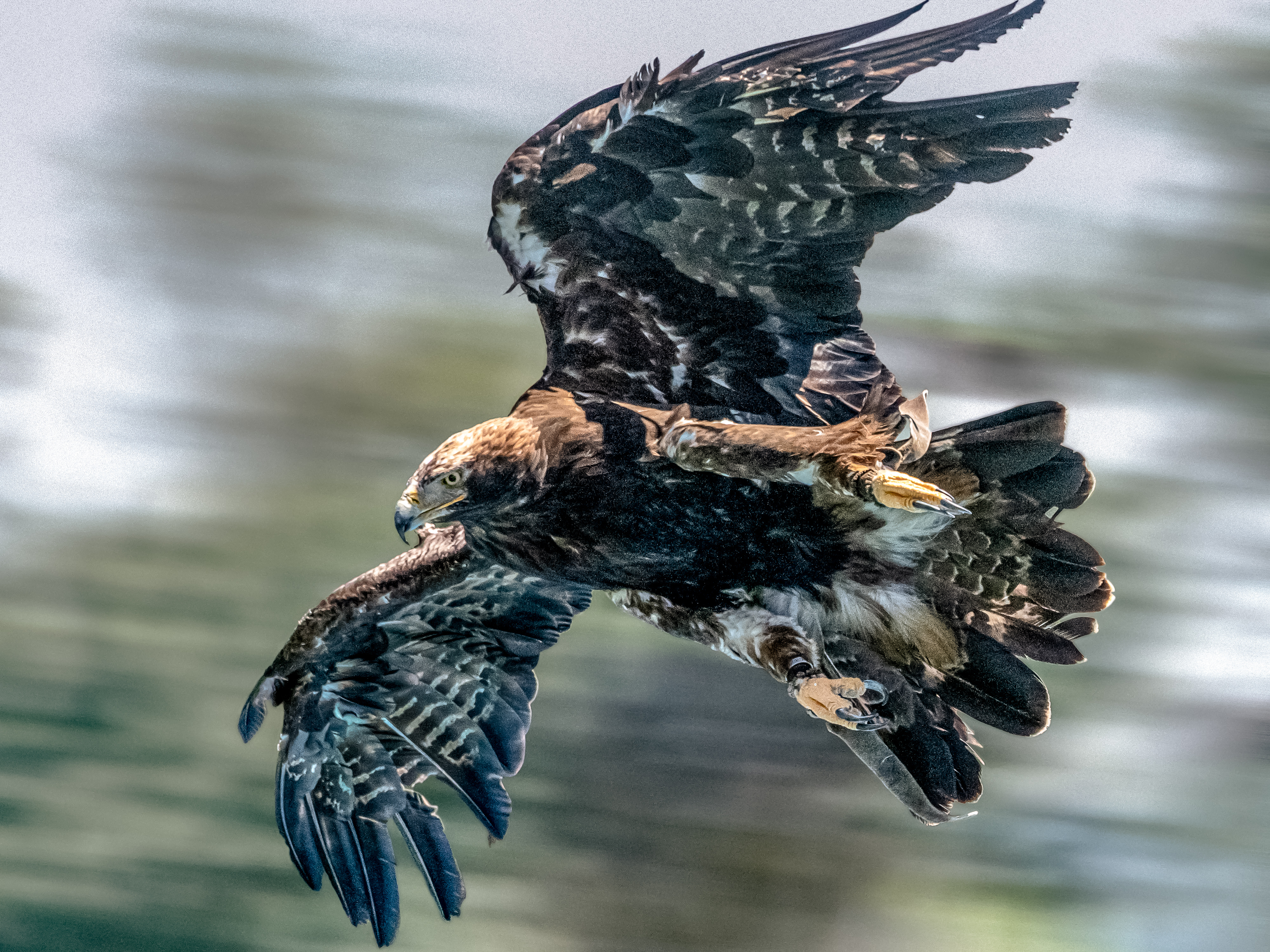
A falconer's eastern imperial eagle, of subadult age, shows its impressive dive toward a fox dummy, completed in seconds.

The size of prey taken by eastern imperial eagles can be fairly variable. Most live prey taken by eastern imperial eagles weighs less than 2 kg (4.4 lb). According to Watson (2010), the prey of imperial eagles is fairly evenly spread from 63 g (2.2 oz) up to 2,000 g (4.4 lb), with a peak focus (at around 25%) on prey weighing 500 and 1,000 g (1.1 and 2.2 lb) and a mean estimated prey size of 565 g (1.246 lb). The preferred sized of prey can be slightly varied throughout the region. In Hungary, staple prey size was estimated at between 250 g (8.8 oz) and 2.5 kg (5.5 lb). By contrast, in Slovakia, maximum weight of live-caught prey was estimated at 1.4 kg (3.1 lb).

Many of the prey species taken by imperial eagles are relatively large as adults such as European hares and bobak marmots (Marmota bobac), which were the second most often taken mammalian prey species in Kazakhstan, but generally, these eagles take juvenile specimens of both hares and marmots rather than prime adults. The suggested weight of European hares and bobak marmots taken in Kazakhstan was estimated at 1.5 kg (3.3 lb) and 1.4 kg (3.1 lb), in both cases no less than a third of the average adult weight attainable by the species, indicating that most of the marmot and hare are mainly young. However, the eastern imperial eagle is capable of taking large prey as well. In some cases, they are capable of taking large sized marmots and adult European hares. Imperial eagles also known to prey on other species such as mountain hare (Lepus timidus) and the Tolai hare (Lepus tolai). They have taken adults of numerous larger water birds averaging over the expected prey weight of 2 kg (4.4 lb), although nestlings are most often preyed upon, including greylag goose (Anser anser), greater white-fronted goose (Anser albifrons), bean goose (Anser fabalis), bar-headed goose (Anser indicus), knob-billed duck (Sarkidiornis melanotos), common crane (Grus grus), great cormorant (Phalacrocorax carbo), white stork and black stork (Ciconia nigra). These avian prey can possibly weigh up to 5 kg (11 lb) in case of common cranes or large geese. Additionally, it is known that eastern imperial eagles will also prey upon great bustards (Otis tarda), though the female is possibly taken as she is about as large as a crane or large goose, it is unlikely that the eagle can take the much larger adult males of this huge ground bird since imperial eagles apparently even avoid adult male birds of much smaller species such as pheasants. Eastern imperial eagles select broadly overlapping prey with mammalian carnivorans but also fairly regularly attack these as prey. Foxes are widely known in the foods of imperial eagles but at times visited as carrion. Red foxes (Vulpes vulpes) and corsac foxes (Vulpes corsac) are known to be taken and a predation attempt on Bengal foxes (Vulpes bengalensis) has been reported. Beyond small weasels, which are probably no issue for large eagles to attack, larger mustelids may be attacked including European (Mustela putorius) and steppe polecats (Mustela eversmanii) and stone martens (Martes foina). On some occasions, domestic cats (Felis catus) are sometimes prey for eastern imperial eagles and Pallas's cats (Otocolobus manul) may too be vulnerable to this eagle. Eastern imperial eagles also attack the young of ungulates at times, reportedly neonatal and mildly older calves and lambs of similar size to the eagles themselves, including species such as argali (Ovis ammon), roe deer (Capreolus capreolus), Arabian sand gazelle (Gazella marica) and goitered gazelle (Gazella subgutturosa). In Africa, the Imperial eagle consumes mammals up to 5 kg (11 lb) as live prey, which is similar in weight to the largest avian kill in Europe. At the opposite end of the scale in vertebrate prey, imperial eagles are known to take mammals down to the size of the 7 g (0.25 oz) Eurasian harvest mouse (Micromys minutus) and birds down to the size of the 21.4 g (0.75 oz) Eurasian tree sparrow (Passer montanus). Much smaller invertebrate prey such as 2 g (0.071 oz) locust was taken in Kazakhstan.

=== Interspecies predatory relationships ===
The eastern imperial eagle is a powerful bird of prey but frequently overlaps in range with multiple other eagle species and that may require them to share both habitats and prey. The golden eagle is generally a larger, more powerful bird. It also tends to be a bolder, more aggressive predator than the imperial eagle and may be able to attack much larger prey. While the mean prey body mass relative to the eagle's weight is probably similar between the two species, an estimated 15% of golden eagle prey will weigh over 5 kg (11 lb). In its very extensive range, the golden eagle's distribution includes nearly all areas occupied by breeding eastern imperial eagles. Furthermore, there is considerable overlap in prey species selected by these species. There is a natural partitioning between the two Aquila species and that comes in the form of habitat preferences. The golden eagle takes to, usually but not always, rocky and uneven terrain, so favors mountainous areas with alpine meadows to access for prey. This is quite different from the eastern imperial eagle's preference for a flat or somewhat rolling interface between wood stands and fields at low elevations. However, in some areas, especially eastern Europe, eastern imperial eagles have been driven to higher elevations and more montane habitats that are typically the haunts of golden eagles by persecution, habitat destruction, and other interferences by humans, usually with mixed to minor success as the golden species is scarce at best locally and unlikely to produce competition. There is surprisingly little information on conflicts between these two eagle species. In the Naurzum Nature Reserve of Kazakhstan the golden and eastern imperial eagle, and to some extent also both white-tailed eagles and steppe eagles, were recorded nesting with fairly close proximity to each other. The eagle species here would even use nests built by the other species and seemed to have similar or broadly overlapping food habits, but no interspecies conflicts were detected. On the contrary, in the Altai Republic, it appears that golden and eastern imperial eagles are considered to fill a largely similar ecological niche in abutting areas and do compete for nesting sites. In some cases in Europe, golden and eastern imperial eagles will engage in a territorial display if prompted against one another.

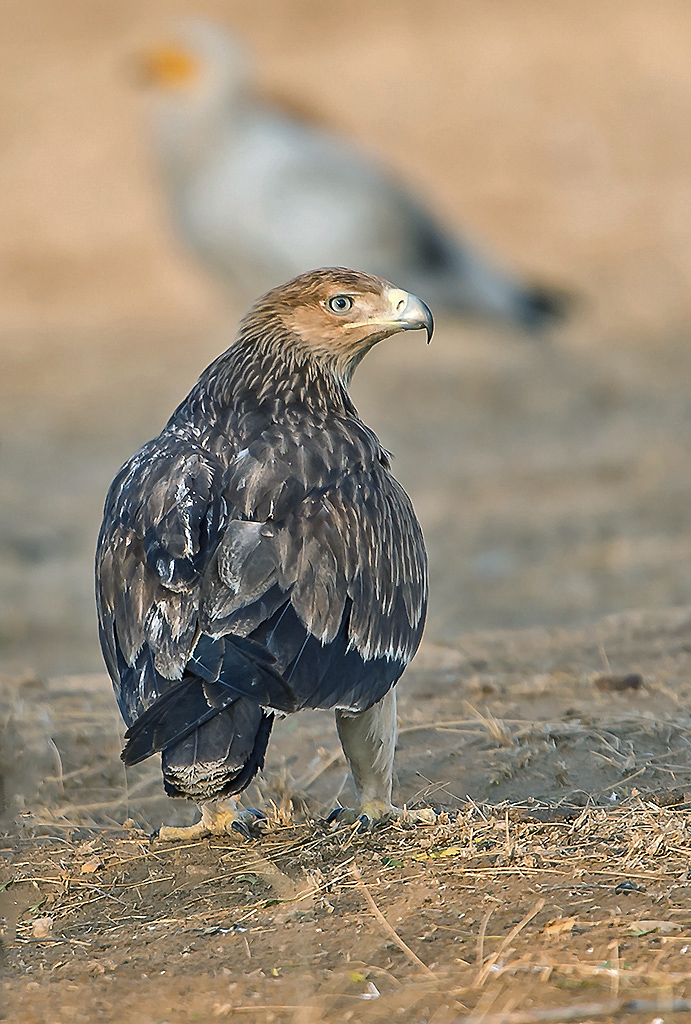
Eastern imperial eagles may be attracted to carrion quite often especially in winter. Here with another scavenger, the Egyptian vulture, in the background.

Of a similar distribution to eastern imperial eagles, both in their mid-Eurasian breeding ground and southerly Indo-African wintering grounds, are the steppe eagle and the greater spotted eagle. There is a fair amount of habitat partitioning between the three species, however, with the steppe eagle preferring flat, often almost treeless steppe while the greater spotted eagle prefers more densely wooded and wetter habitats generally than imperial eagles such as taiga bogs. Diet however can overlap considerably, especially with steppe eagles as both it and the imperial species are largely attracted to colonies of ground squirrels in Central Asia. While steppe eagles occur much more broadly in Africa during winter and a similarly narrow extent in the Indian subcontinent as eastern imperials, greater spotted eagles are similarly as rare as imperial eagles in Africa but spread farther in Asia than either the steppe or imperial species. In all three species, by winter they are attracted to more open habitats ranging from savanna to wetlands and even semi-desert. The ecology of wintering eastern imperials was studied at length in Bharatpur district of India in contrast to the steppe and greater spotted eagle as well as the resident Indian spotted eagle and shorter-distance migrant Pallas's fish eagle. It was found that the feeding opportunities sought were largely similar (nestling water birds were often favored) by all five eagle species and that a hierarchy was formed, though each species competed most regularly with others of their own species. The eastern imperial eagle was, by and large, dominant in correspondence to its slightly larger size than the other booted eagles and rivaled the similarly-sized Pallas's fish eagle as the top avian predator in this raptor community. The steppe eagle, despite being only scarcely smaller than an imperial eagle, was usually subordinate to imperial eagles and had a much lower estimated average daily food intake, 141 g (5.0 oz) against an average of 539 g (1.188 lb) for the imperial. However, the mean daily intake of Pallas's fish eagle was slightly higher still at 623 g (1.373 lb) and the fish eagle would perch slightly higher than the imperials as well. In one case, a flock of 9 steppe eagles was able to pirate a freshly caught coot from an imperial eagle. The imperial was the most inactive forager here, having spent 36% of observed hours foraging, against 45% for steppe eagles, 46% for Pallas's fish eagle, 49% for greater spotted eagle and 65% for Indian spotted eagle. Other studies on the interactions of eastern imperial eagles also support that it is dominant during winter over similar species such as steppe and the spotted eagles at competitive feeding spots. In the Korean Peninsula, similarly as in the Indian subcontinent, wintering eastern imperial eagles (though rare) can reportedly be seen more than singly concentrated where there are ample numbers of water birds along with other large eagles. Next to nothing is known about the ecology of the rare, seldom-observed wintering population of eastern imperial eagles in east Africa but it is claimed to usually be seen in the company of "other brown eagles".

As its preferred habitat seldom overlaps with larger eagles such as golden eagles and white-tailed eagles, the eastern imperial eagle is usually the top avian predator in its breeding grounds. In particular, smaller raptors with largely overlapping diets (i.e. ground squirrels, hamsters, voles and lagomorphs) and habitat preferences such as saker falcons (Falco cherrug) and long-legged buzzards (Buteo rufinus) are often at a disadvantage in direct competition with the eagle species. In Slovakia, some pairs of imperial eagle were reported to kleptoparasitize other raptors as a matter of routine. Here, four species consisting of saker falcons, western marsh harrier (Circus aeruginosus), black-winged kite (Elanus caeruleus) and Eurasian sparrowhawk (Accipiter nisus) as well as red foxes were all robbed of their catches with a remarkable degree of success by imperial eagles. The eagles so heavily depleted the falcons' catches that the falcons' nesting attempts failed. A still swifter falcon than the saker, the peregrine falcon (Falco peregrinus) was observed successfully robbing imperial eagles and a few other raptorial birds several times when the species nested near each other in the lower Sakmara river of Russia (although in one case, a juvenile peregrine was killed by the golden eagle it was attempting to rob). Interestingly, many of the imperial eagle kills that were robbed by the peregrines were other species of bird of prey. In Tatarstan, Russia it was found that eastern imperial eagles have begun nesting in atypical habitats and locations, namely the old nests of white-tailed eagles in isolated trees amongst open wetlands and old nests of a greater spotted eagle in densely wooded bogs. Despite the remaining presence of both other eagle species in the area, competition is probably not the driver for the imperial eagle altering its nesting habits but instead, it is likely due to the heavy human-caused depletion of the imperial eagles preferred prey of ground squirrels and hamsters in the area, with the wetland-located nests putting them close to currently reliable alternate primary foods, mainly water birds.

The eastern imperial eagle may be characterized as an occasional and opportunistic predator of other birds of prey. The following raptorial birds have been known to fall prey this eagle: the lesser spotted eagle (Clanga pomarina), European honey buzzard (Pernis apivorus), black kite (Milvus migrans), hen harrier (Circus cyaneus), Montagu's harrier (Circus pygargus), western marsh harrier, Eurasian sparrowhawk, northern goshawk (Accipiter gentilis), common buzzard (Buteo buteo), long-legged buzzard, rough-legged buzzard (Buteo lagopus), Ural owl (Strix uralensis), tawny owl (Strix alucco), little owl (Athene noctua), long-eared owl (Asio otus), short-eared owl (Asio flammeus), Eurasian hobby (Falco subbuteo), common kestrel (Falco tinnunculus), lesser kestrel (Falco naumanni), merlin (Falco columbarius), red-footed falcon (Falco vespertinus), saker falcon and peregrine falcon. Although it may be classed properly as an apex predator, eastern imperial eagles have fallen prey to other birds of prey on rare occasions. An instance of predation was reportedly committed by a white-tailed eagle. Furthermore, imperial eagles may be vulnerable at their nest to nighttime ambushes by Eurasian eagle-owls (Bubo bubo).

== Breeding ==
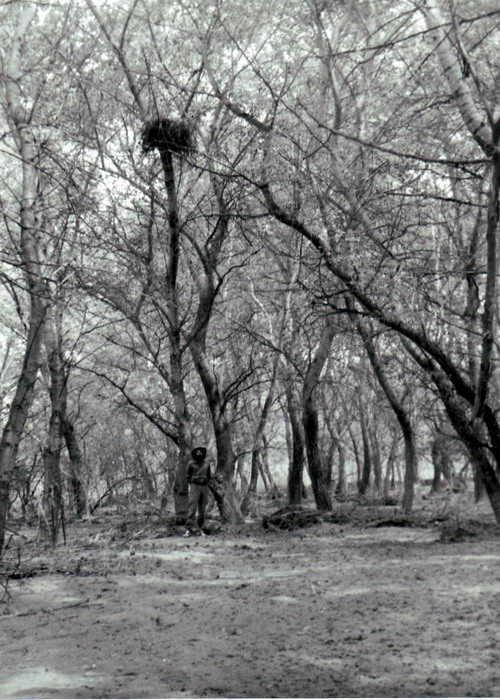
Nest of eastern imperial eagle in Georgia.

The eastern imperial eagle is a fairly solitary bird, with rarely more than a pair occurring, although some small gatherings recorded at waterholes or food during migrant or winter. Pairs on the breeding grounds engage in aerial displays with loud calling and extensive high circling, which like most of accipitrids is likely for the purposes territorial proclamation to other eagles of their species. The display is often interspersed with mock dives and talon showing. One or both members of a pair may participate in the aerial display. If an interloper does not leave during the first part of the display, the territorial skirmish then may become physical and it sometimes leads to cartwheeling with interlocked talons, falling until they nearly hit the ground. Despite the fairly impressive display, it is generally of slightly shorter duration than the similar one done by golden eagles. In East Thrace, Turkey, the mean nearest nest distance between actively breeding pairs was 10.44 km (6.49 mi). In the Irkutsk Oblast near Lake Baikal, the mean distance of the central area of nests (each pair had more than one nest on territory) was 17 km (11 mi). The breeding season lasts from late March to September throughout the range but in their former range in Pakistan (where it is now extirpated as a breeder) was said to extend from November to April. The pair constructs a very large nest of sticks, which may average up to 1.2 to 1.5 m (3 ft 11 in to 4 ft 11 in) across and 60 to 70 cm (24 to 28 in) in depth. However, nests for the species have been recorded to measure up to 2.4 m (7 ft 10 in) or more across and 1.8 to 2 m (5 ft 11 in to 6 ft 7 in) deep. Nests can outmatch in size those even of larger species such as golden eagles. Nests are frequently lined with various materials, including twigs, grass, fur, debris and greenery. Usually eastern imperial eagles build their nest in tall trees but recorded down to as low as 2 m (6.6 ft) in low scrub or, rarely, on cliff or ground (later as recorded in the Sayan Mountains of Kazakhstan). Nest sites have been found anywhere from in the depth of a forest to forest edge to a solitary tree that may be visible for miles in open plains. Nesting sites in both Turkey and Georgia were consistently under 450 m (1,480 ft) elevation. In Georgia, denser mixed forests with openings were favored alternately with more arid, isolated stands of juniper (Juniperus ssp.) and pistachio (Pistacia vera); in Turkey, poplar (Populus ssp.) (44%) and oak (Quercus ssp.) (40%) were favored. In extensive Russian studies, 78% of nests were in conifers when compared with Kazakhstan where deciduous trees are more prevalent, however in the latter country conifers are still used where they are found. Unusual nest sites in agricultural land of Slovakia include one next to a railroad and another next to a busy road. The eastern imperial eagle has also been recorded as nesting on electric poles and towers in Russia and Kazakhstan. In several cases they aggressively took over the nests from steppe eagles that were previously nesting on the electric towers. Often one nest is used but sometimes a 2nd or 3rd is constructed by the imperial eagle pair may exist on a home range.

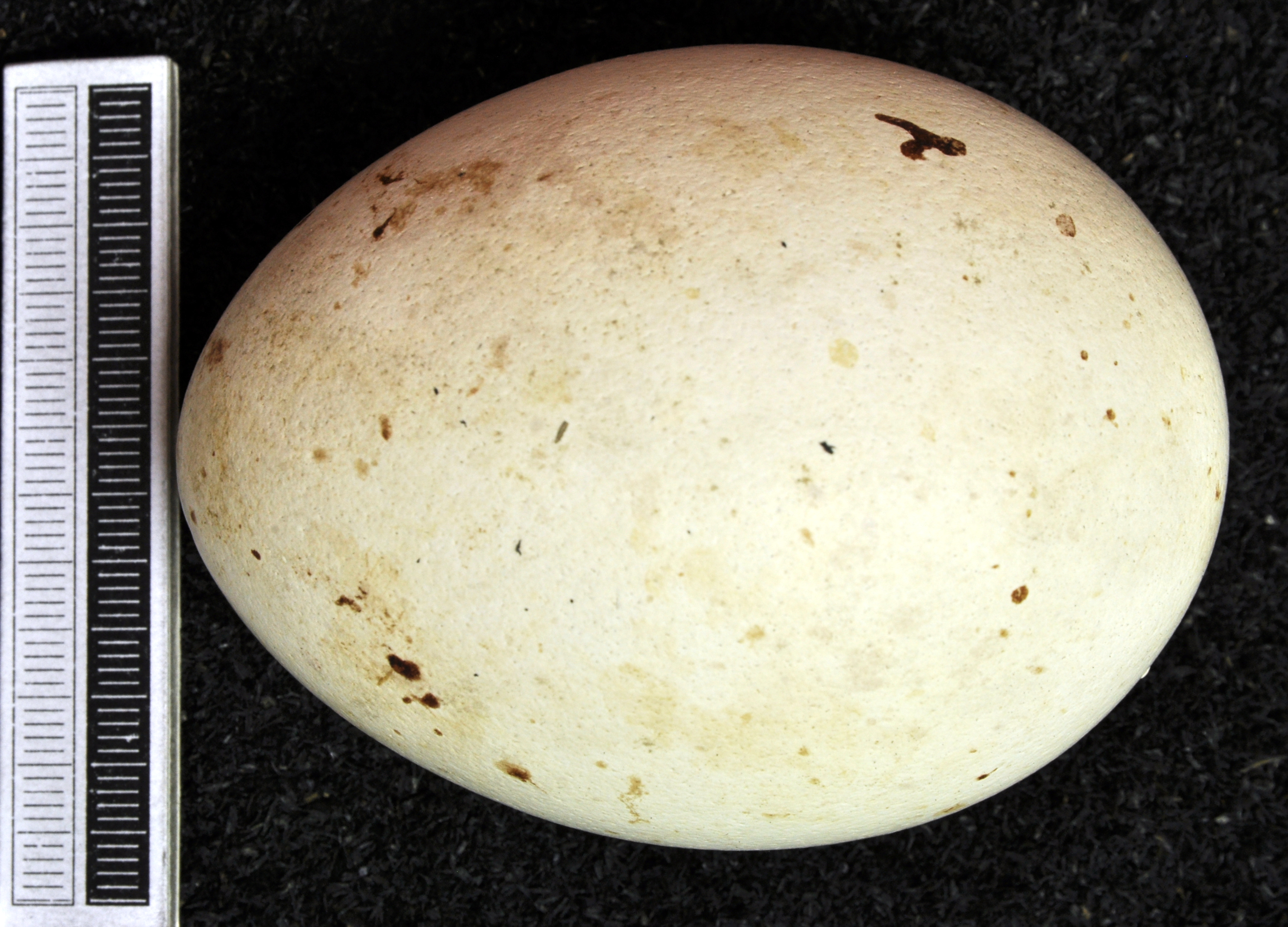
Egg, Collection Museum Wiesbaden

The mother eastern imperial eagle lays 2 to 3 eggs at intervals of 2 or more days. The average clutch size in Georgia was 2.09. In the Czech Republic, the average clutch size was 2.27. 81 nests from Russia had a mean clutch size of 2.1. Exceptional clutch sizes of up to four eggs have been recorded in Kazakhstan. The eggs are a dull buffish white colour overall and are sparsely marked with grey, purplish or, occasionally, brown spots. A sample of 150 eggs were found to have measured from 63 to 82.5 mm (2.48 to 3.25 in) in height by 52.5 to 62.5 mm (2.07 to 2.46 in), with an average of 73.3 mm × 56.5 mm (2.89 in × 2.22 in). In Georgia, the average dimensions of eggs was measured in a sample of 20 as 72.3 mm × 57.5 mm (2.85 in × 2.26 in) with a mean weight of 136.8 g (4.83 oz). As was recorded in 13 cases in Slovakia, if eggs are lost early into incubation, around March or April, a replacement clutch may be laid, though always the parent eagles used an alternate nest when this occurred. In southeast Europe egg laying peaks at about mid-February to March while in central Asia, it is in first half of April shifting late April further north. The incubation starts with the 1st egg, with males only infrequently taking a shift. The incubation stage lasts for 43 days. In Bulgaria, two females were recorded to do 90.8-94.1% of the incubating. The eaglets hatch at intervals of several days, with one usually being distinctly larger than the rest. However, cases of siblicide are infrequent compared to the golden eagle and, when not interrupted by human interference, prey population crashes and nest collapses, nest frequently bear two fledglings. At 14 days of age, the first feathers through down, while feathers on the back starting at 21 days. Feathers cover the down by 35–40 days but sometimes the down persists about head and neck for up to 45 days. Feathering is complete at 55 days and first flight attempts by 60 days onward. Mostly the female broods the young and male captures prey in this species (as is often the case in booted eagles in which males rarely engage in direct brooding). From when the young are 40 days onward, the female eastern imperial eagle typically resumes hunting and takes to a perch nearby. Male does not appear to bring prey directly to the nest instead to nearby branch for female to dismantle. One or two large prey items last 1–2 days but small prey may require up to 5-6 daily prey deliveries. Fledgling may variously occur at anywhere from 63 to 77 days. After leaving the nest the young linger near it for 2–3 days. Breeding success was once considerable in Russia at about 1.5 young per pair.

=== Breeding success and survivorship ===
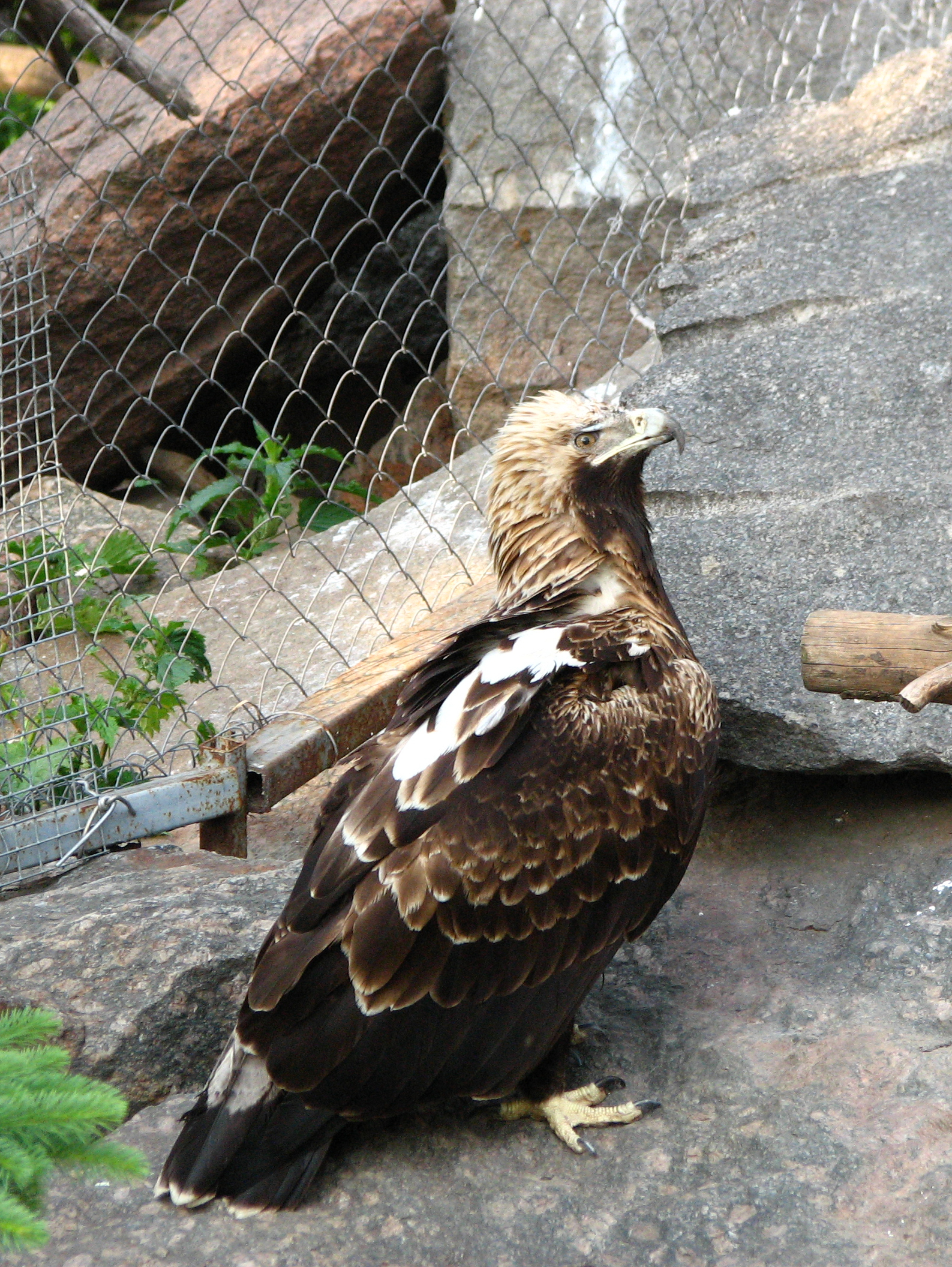
A captive adult eastern imperial eagle.

Breeding success is somewhat variable in the eastern imperial eagle. In the Czech Republic the 1-3 pairs found to be nesting in 1998-2009 had an average number of 1.53 fledglings. In the Hungarian population, it was recorded that from fewer than one fledgling per pair that average had increased to 1.15 fledglings per pair in 2001-2009. In 2011 in Bulgaria, with a gradual increase of the population to 20 occupied territories, success rate was shown to be about 1 fledgling per pair. By 2014, productivity was reported as averaging similarly at 1.03 fledgling per pair in Bulgaria. In Austria, the average number of fledglings per successful pair was 1.63. Of 27 breeding Austrian breeding attempts, 22 were successful. In East Thrace, Turkey, the breeding success was estimated at 1.01 fledglings per pair. Pairs living in the Marmara region were more productive than those in the Dervent heights (1.05 vs 0.91). Breeding success in Hungary reportedly was driven largely by the age of the nesting pair, with mature adults more likely to show adaptability to changes in habitat and prey, and secondarily to habitat composition. In particular, nesting success tends to higher in lowland areas against higher elevation nests. Post-dispersal in Bulgaria, the most significant cause of juvenile mortality per radio-tagging studies was shown to be electrocution (59% of the mortalities), followed by poisoning and shooting. The radio-tracking studies of Bulgarian juveniles showed survival rates were 59.1% in the 1st year of life, 83.3% for the 2nd year, 80% for the 3rd year. Furthermore, 50% of the mortalities of the Bulgarian juveniles occurred in Bulgaria while 43% occurred after they'd migrated to Turkey. Electrocution by collision with power lines are likely major causes of mortality almost throughout the range. Furthermore, other deadly collisions with manmade objects, including automobiles and wind turbines, are also a persistent threat. Like other birds of prey, eastern imperial eagles are occasionally vulnerable to Haematozoa, helminths and viruses as well as maggot infection in a wound by blowflies. Studies to determine if there's a skewered sex ratio of offspring for eastern imperial eagles in Kazakhstan and secondarily in Serbia determined that the ratio of males to females was nearly equal and stable. For example pairs in the Naurzum Nature Reserve showed during study to produce 123 males and 116 females from 1998-2004. Further study in Kazakhstan showed that adult survivorship was about 84%, which is somewhat low for long-lived raptor, but nonetheless reproductive rate shown to be sufficient to maintain a stable breeding population. While breeding success in areas such as Naurzum reserve may be successful, in non-pristine habitats of Kazakhstan the breeding population may not necessarily be self-sustaining. In Bulgaria, estimates of adult survivorship were from 75 to 94%. Against the overall stability of Kazakhstani imperial eagles and the gradual increased success of European nesting eagles, a rapidly declining population has been noted with alarm, in nearly at the species' eastern limits as breeder in Lake Baikal. Here fledgling success has decreased from roughly 71% to about 52%.

== Status ==
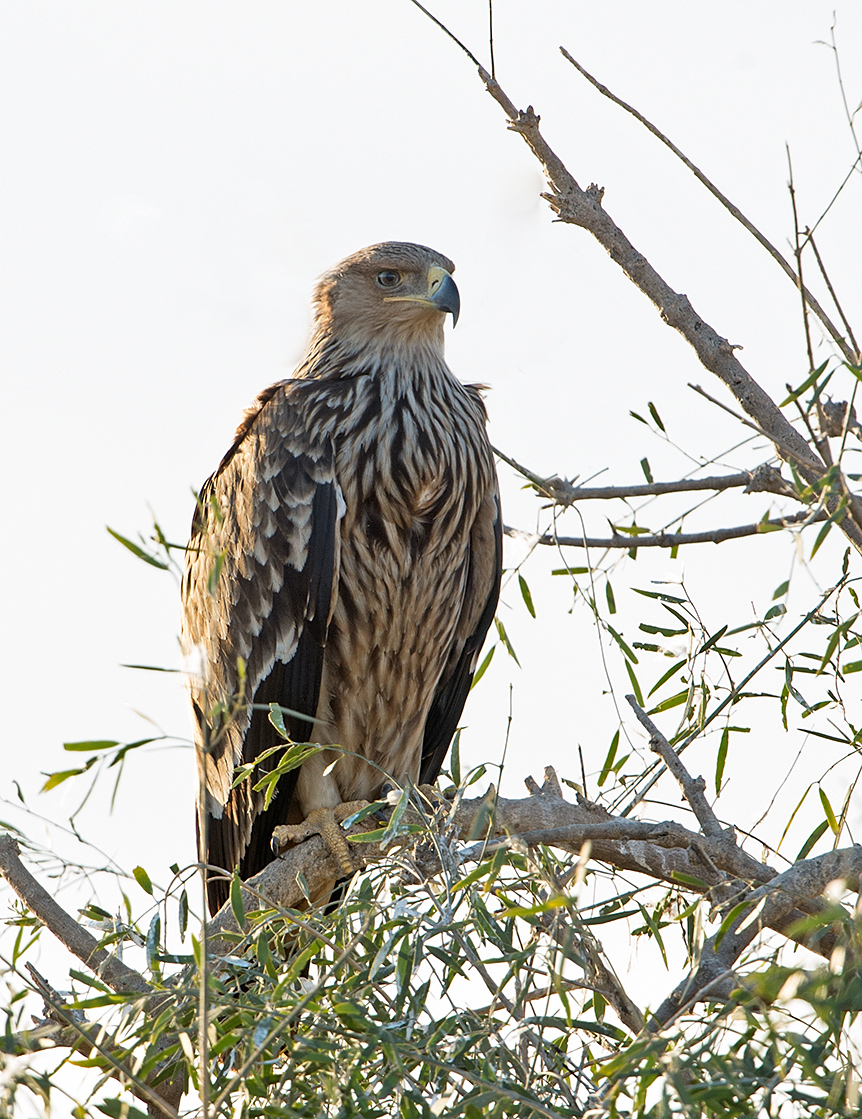
A juvenile eastern imperial eagle in Rajasthan, India

The eastern imperial eagle has declined greatly through history. At one time, people of eastern Europe and adjacent parts of Russia used to admire and even revere this eagle as a "sacred bird". It was widely referred to as the "cross-bearing eagle" (because of the shape of the white spots on its wings). According to folklore, the imperial eagle was able to divert the hailstorm clouds from the area it inhabited, and it was thus able to save farmers' crops. Therefore, the monarchy of Austria-Hungary once chose the imperial eagle to be its heraldic animal. Despite the historic reverence for the species, it was not spared the negative and hostile view of all birds of prey that arose throughout Europe and its colonies in the 17th century onwards, and the resulting persecution of essentially all birds of prey, including the eastern imperial eagle. However, almost certainly the leading cause of this species' decline was the practice of felling old trees on field boundaries that were the nest sites for the eagle. Among other reasons for its decline were the depletion (both incidental and intentional) of prey species and the incidental consumption by the eagles of poison baits, left out to eliminate wolves. As with other eagles in Eurasia, the Industrial Revolution allowed access to poisons and firearms, which made the killing of eagles far easier and hastened their decline. Towards the end of the 19th century, 1824 nests were recorded in Bulgaria, but by 1979 only 5 to 12 pairs remained in the country. Similarly, from a population once numbering in the thousands, the Hungarian population of imperial eagles was driven down to only 10-15 pairs by 1975-1980. In Greece, the eastern imperial eagle was extirpated altogether as a breeding species. While the declines further east in the species range have been less studied, more or less the same threats likely persist throughout the range. Some reserves in central Russia and Kazakhstan have retained semi-stable populations, due in no small part to their isolation. However, the eastern imperial eagle has also been extirpated as a breeding species from Pakistan and Afghanistan.

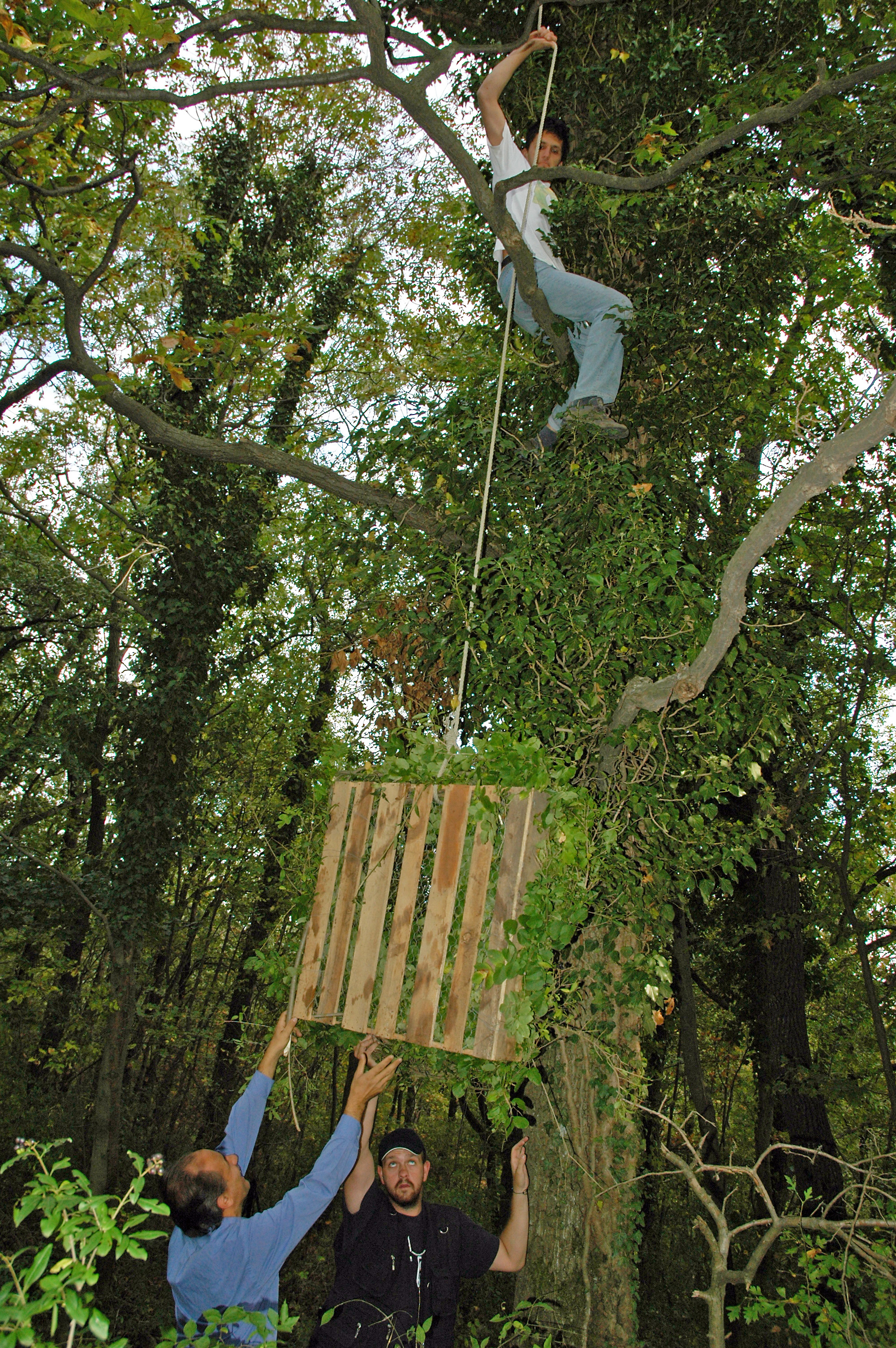
Biologists working to place an artificial nests for imperial eagles to use.

Today, dedicated conservationists and biologists are working extensively to remediate and reverse the decline of eastern imperial eagle. The eastern imperial eagle was uplisted to Vulnerable in 1994, and global protection initiatives were begun around this time. By 1996, it was estimated that there were 363–604 pairs in all of Europe including European Russia. By 2000–2010, the number of breeding pairs in Europe was estimated at up to 1,800-2,200, a significant increase. Peak numbers in Europe may fall along the European Green Belt. The strongest increases were in Hungary where from 10–15 pairs in the late 1970s an estimated total of 105 nesting pairs by the late 2000s. Conversions and conservation of lowland wildlands, has allowed the numbers of pairs using less ideal mountainous habitat decrease from 50% to 15% of breeding imperials, as they've shifted to more ideal lowland habitat. The nation's imperial eagle population has been continuously protected and monitored since 1975. Further efforts in Hungary were the mitigation of human-eagle conflicts through education in Hungary as poisoning (whether these eagles are the main target or not) continues, as well as general coordination with landowners and agricultural interests as the eastern imperial eagles are often required to forage in such areas. Other increases or returns to former parts of their range include have been noted in the Morava region of southwestern Slovakia as well as some parts of the Czech Republic, Serbia and Austria. However, overall 85% of the population in the Carpathian mountains region that forms the bulk of the land in eastern Europe was restricted to the Great Hungarian Plain, and were isolated from other populations. In Slovakia, the gap in the distribution in the Carpathian basin has led to concern about genetic isolation. Upon review, the genetic isolation of the two Slovak populations was determined to be "marginally significant". The number of pairs of eastern imperial eagles increased in Bulgaria from 20 in 2009 to 24 in 2013. Among the efforts untaken to restore the Bulgarian populations were mitigating hazardous electrical poles, 608 were insulated within eagle territories, while also 483 supplemental feedings were given to 14 pairs from October to March. In Turkey, the number of imperial eagle pairs in recent estimates during the 21st century was widely placed at 35–150 pairs, probably closer to the higher number as there is evidence for there being 30–50 pairs in the East Thrace region alone.

In some areas of western Russia and in Kazakhstan, the eastern imperial eagle has maintained the nearest thing to a population stronghold. In 2011, the total estimated number of pairs was estimated at 3000–3500 in Russia and 3500–4000 in Kazakhstan. Though only 1534 breeding territories found firsthand, only some parts of the range were surveyed. According to Russian and Kazakh studies, cattle grazing in taiga forest edge appeared to benefit imperial eagles since they encourage habitat for prey, especially ground squirrels. In Kazakhstan moister conditions, possibly correlated with climate change seems to have increased populations of yellow ground squirrels and second growth trees which both are likely to have caused a localized increase there. In Naurzum Nature Reserve alone nearly 300 imperial eagles may congregate in winter, making it a "critical refugium" for this species. On the other hand, precipitous decline has been detected in the Lake Baikal region of Russia and the species may be on its way to local extinction there. In the 1950s, imperial eagle pairs in the Baikal area numbered 250–300 strong. A strong decline was already noted by the mid-1980s when 150–200 pairs remained. However, the reduction hastened even more to merely 70 pairs in 1999. The Baikal imperial eagles during monitoring from 1950 to 1999 showed no overall changes in habitat or pair occupancy. In the 1998-1999 period, fledgling success was also found to drop considerably. Satellite study of migrating birds from Lake Baikal at migration stopovers and winter sites was reviewed but only 4 eagles were studied so results could not clearly determine whether depletions were mostly occurring at this time rather than during breeding. The reason for the sharp declines of the Baikal imperial eagles are not fully understood but are likely correlated with habitat destruction and human land use changes followed by pesticide use and other toxic threats through bioaccumulation. Reductions have also been reported in the lower Ural Mountains region of Russia with largely similar threats but it is not known what the exact rate of reduction is here. Although gone from Pakistan as a breeding species, it continues to be a key wintering site as around 150 eagles are estimated to winter in Pakistan.
