= Zhaksybay (lake) =

Lake in Kazakhstan

- Жақсыбай
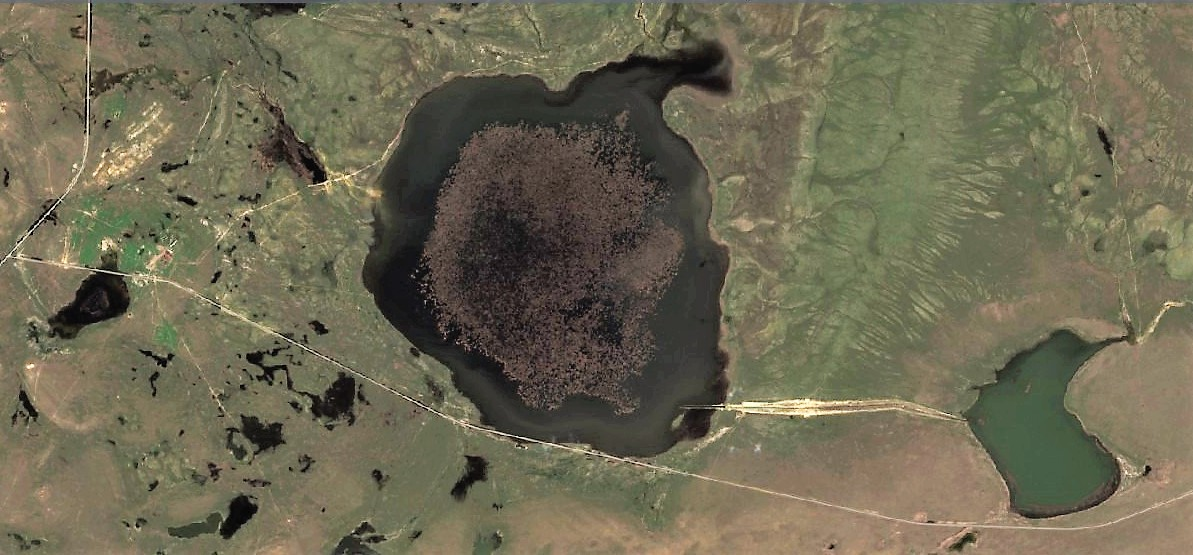
- Sentinel-2 picture of the lake and its smaller neighbor

- Location within Kazakhstan
- Location: Turgay Plateau
- Coordinates: 51°32′24″N 63°22′55″E
- Type: endorheic lake
- Basin countries: Kazakhstan
- Max. length: 5.1 kilometers (3.2 mi)
- Max. width: 4 kilometers (2.5 mi)
- Surface area: 14 square kilometers (5.4 sq mi)
- Residence time: UTC+5:00
- Shore length^{1}: 18 kilometers (11 mi)
- Surface elevation: 229 meters (751 ft)
- Islands: no
- ^{1} Shore length is not a well-defined measure.

Zhaksybay (Kazakh: Жақсыбай) is a lake in Nauyrzym District, Kostanay Region, Kazakhstan.

The lake is located 13 kilometers (8.1 mi) to the northeast of Razdolnoye. Road KP-21 passes by the southern lakeshore.

Zhaksybay was named after a Kazakh person.

== Geography ==
Zhaksybay is an endorheic lake located in the southern sector of the Turgay Plateau between the sources of the Ulkayak and the Tobol rivers. The lake lies at an elevation of 229 meters (751 ft). Small lake Batpakkol lies 2.5 kilometers (1.6 mi) to the east of the southeastern shore and is connected to it by a channel.

Zhaksybay has a roughly oval shape, with an inlet in the north, and a maximum length of approximately 5 kilometers (3.1 mi). Its shores are irregular, mostly flat and swampy, but rocky in the south. The bottom is muddy. The lake freezes between November and April. Lake Akmolakol lies 4 kilometers (2.5 mi) to the northeast, Urkash 48 kilometers (30 mi) to the southwest, and Zharman 55 kilometers (34 mi) to the east.

== Flora and fauna ==
The lake basin is surrounded by steppe vegetation and is used for grazing local cattle. The water is fresh in the spring.

== See also ==
- List of lakes of Kazakhstan
