= Shili =

Shili Шилі
- Village
- Location in Kazakhstan
- Coordinates: 51°35′30″N 64°44′33″E
- Country: Kazakhstan
- Region: Kostanay Region
- District: Naurzum District

Population (2009)
  - Total: 697
- Time zone: UTC+6 (East Kazakhstan Time)
- Post code: 111408

Shili (Kazakh: Шилі; Russian: Шили) is a village in Naurzum District, Kostanay Region, Kazakhstan. It is the administrative center of the Shili Rural District (KATO code - 395859100). Population: 697 (2009 census results); 1,143 (1999 census results).

== Geography ==
The village is located about 37 kilometers (23 mi) east of Karamendy, the district administrative center. Now abandoned Naurzum village is located 17 kilometers (11 mi) to the WSW. Lake Zharman lies 15 kilometers (9.3 mi) to the west.
