= Naurzum Nature Reserve =

Nature reserve in Kazakhstan

- Наурызым мемлекеттік табиғи қорығы
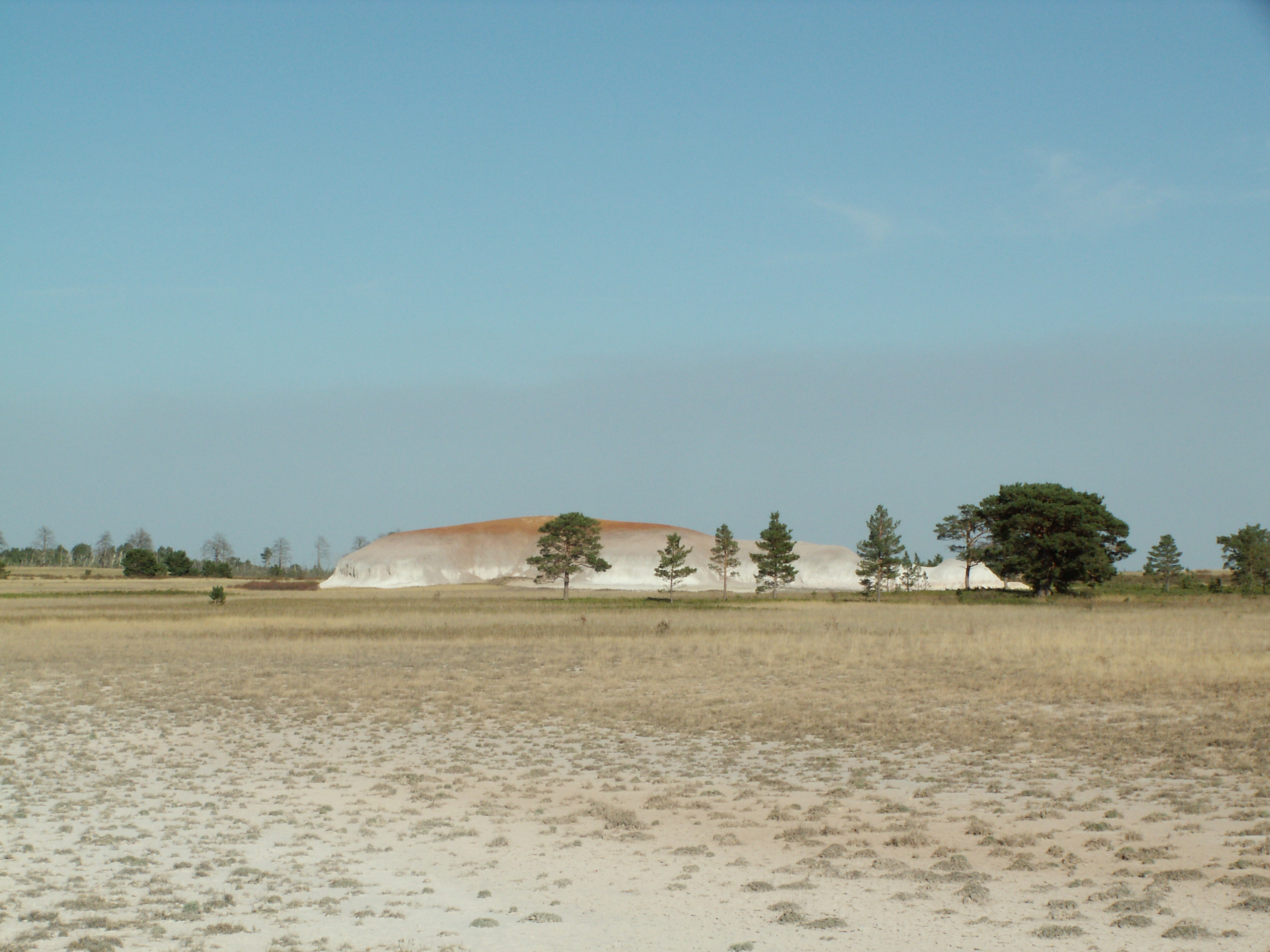

- Location within Kazakhstan
- Type: Inland wetlands
- Location: Kostanay Region, Kazakhstan
- Nearest city: Karamendy
- Coordinates: 51°32′0″N 64°26′20″E
- Area: 3,081 km^{2} (308,100 ha)
- Created: 1931
- Operator: Main Department of Zapovedniks and Game Management - Republic of Kazakhstan
- Status: Nature reserve

Ramsar Wetland
- Official name: Naurzum Lake System
- Designated: 12 July 2009
- Reference no.: 1872

Naurzum State Nature Reserve (Kazakh: Наурызым мемлекеттік табиғи қорығы, Nauryzym memlekettık tabiği qoryğy) is a nature reserve in Kostanay Region, Kazakhstan. It is part of the UNESCO heritage site Saryarka – Steppe and Lakes of Northern Kazakhstan. It protects about 3,081 square kilometres (1,190 sq mi) of steppes, semi desert and forests. The administrative office of the protected area is located in Karamendy village.

== Size ==
The protected area is located in the central part of the Turgay Plateau within the steppe zone of Kazakhstan. Aksuat lake is located in the reserve. It consists of three clusters of core areas, which are surrounded by buffer zones and connected via a protected eco-corridor. The core area is about 1.910 km^{2} (0.737 mi^{2}); the buffer zone is about 1.167 km^{2} (0.451 mi^{2}) in size.

Main Area Naurzum-Kargay Cluster is the largest of the three component areas. It is located about 320 km (200 mi) west of the capital city of Nur Sultan. This area consists of 1,397.14 km^{2} (539.44 mi^{2}) and includes several large lakes including Zharman Lake.

Sypsyn-Aebu Cluster is located about 8 km (5.0 mi) west of Naurzum-Kargay. It contains 387.20 km^{2} (149.50 mi^{2}).

Tersek-Karagay Cluster is located about 8 km (5.0 mi) north of Sypsyn-Aebu. It contains 129.47 km^{2} (49.99 mi^{2}).

An Eco-Corridor of 311.59 km^{2} (120.31 mi^{2}) borders all three clusters merging them into a unified area, that along with additional buffer areas of 855.675 km^{2} (330.378 mi^{2}) surrounding the three core areas, provides a total protected area of 3,081 km^{2} (1,190 mi^{2}).

== Flora ==
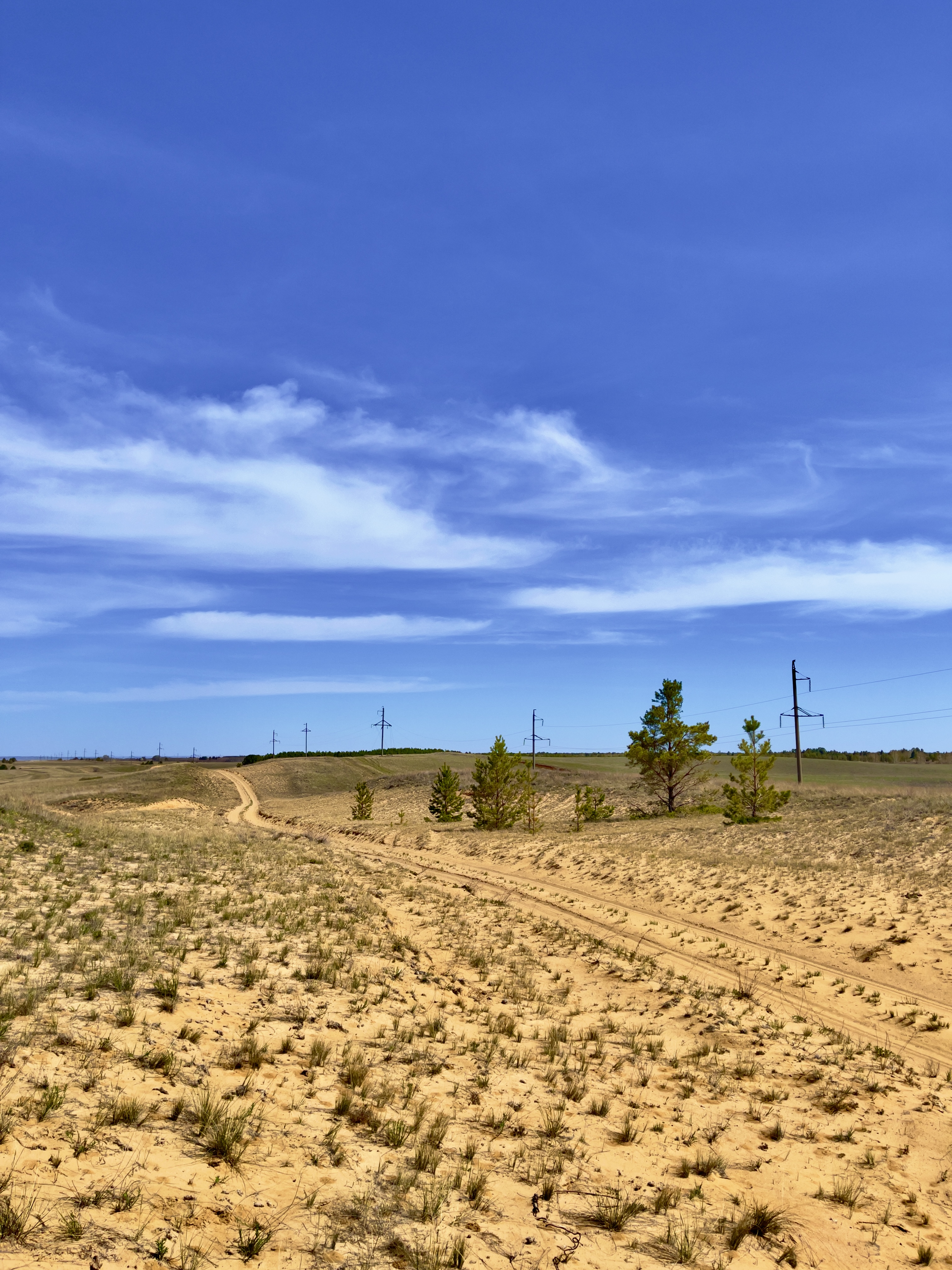

The vegetation is diverse and consists of steppes, shrub lands, semi deserts and as a unique feature within the southern steppe zone, also forests. These forests are composed mainly of pine (Pinus sylvestris), birch (Betula pendula, B. pubescens) and aspen (Populus tremula). Along the seashores there is also typical aquatic vegetation of sedges and reeds. In the shrub dominated parts, typical steppe shrubs are Russian almond (Amygdalus nana), cherry (Cerasus fruticosa), greenweed (Cytisus ruthenicus) (western distribution boundary), species of wild roses (Rosa) and juniper (Juniperus sabinea). At moister places there also willow bushes (Salix) and along lake shores, tamarisk (Tamarix ramosissima).

== Fauna ==
There are 47 species of mammals, 279 species of birds, 10 species of reptile and amphibious animals and 10 species of fish reported in the reserve. In addition more than 1000 species of invertebrates are found. Typical mammals of the steppe zone are steppe polecat (Mustela eversmanni), corsac fox (Vulpes corsac), common fox (Vulpes vulpes), Eurasian wolf (Canis lupus lupus), long-eared hedgehog (Erinaceus auritus), European hare (Lepus europaeus) and several rodent species like bobak marmot (Marmota bobac), large-toothed souslik (Spermophylus fulvus), red-cheeked souslik (Spermophylus major), little souslik (Spermophylus pygmeus), common hamster (Cricetus cricetus), jerboas (Allactaga major, Stylodipus telum) as well as several species of voles and lemmings. The forests are inhabited by elk (Alces alces), Tartarian roe deer (Capreolus pygargus), Eurasian lynx (Lynx lynx), badger (Meles meles), ermine (Mustela erminea), weasel (Mustela nivalis), pine marten (Martes martes) and raccoon dog (Nyctereutes procyonoides), red squirrel (Sciurus vulgaris), European hedgehog (Erinaceus europaeus), Blue Hare (Lepus timidus). Mainly along rivers one can also find wild boar (Sus scrofa). Among the species, which can be found occasionally in the deserts and semi deserts of the reserve is the rare saiga antelope (Saiga tatarica).

== See also ==
- List of Ramsar Wetlands of International Importance
