= Zharman =

Lake in Kazakhstan

- Жарман
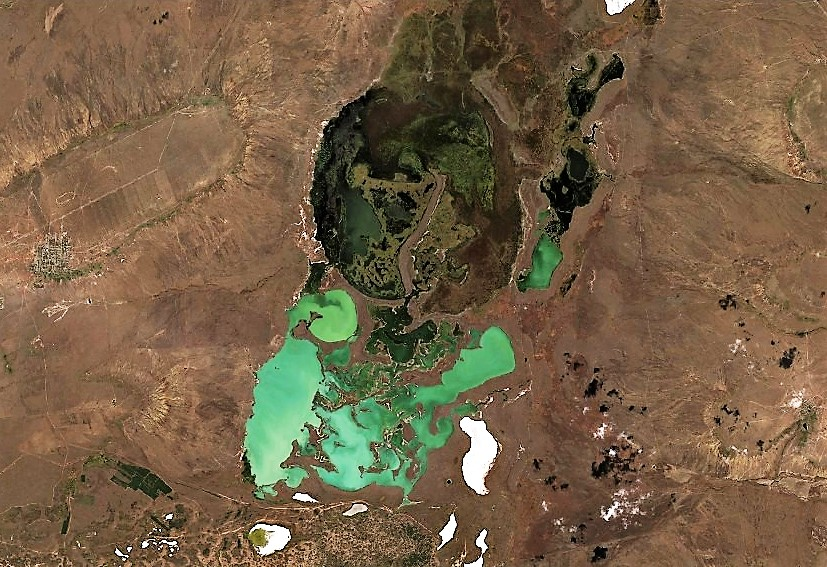
- Sentinel-2 image of the lake

- Location within Kazakhstan
- Coordinates: 51°35′N 64°27′E
- Type: endorheic
- Catchment area: 1,860 square kilometers (720 sq mi)
- Basin countries: Kazakhstan
- Max. length: 12.8 kilometers (8.0 mi)
- Max. width: 7 kilometers (4.3 mi)
- Surface area: 56.9 square kilometers (22.0 sq mi)
- Max. depth: 1.5 meters (4 ft 11 in)
- Residence time: UTC+6

Zharman (Kazakh: Жарман) is a salt lake in Naurzum District, Kostanay Region, Kazakhstan.

Zharman is part of the main lake group of the Naurzum Nature Reserve, a 191,381 hectares (472,910 acres) protected area established in 2009. The village of Karamendy, former Dokuchayevka, is located 8 kilometers (5.0 mi) to the west, and Shili village 12 kilometers (7.5 mi) to the east of the lake. Now abandoned Naurzum village is located near the southern lakeshore.

== Geography ==
Zharman is a shallow saline steppe lake. It lies at the bottom of a vast depression of the Turgay Basin, between lakes Sarymoin and Zharkol to the north, and Aksuat to the south. Lake Zhaksybay lies 55 kilometers (34 mi) to the west. The coastline is very indented, with multitude of bays and peninsulas. Shores are sandy and the bottom is muddy. Meadows near the shore are a seasonal grazing ground for local cattle.

The lake is fed by spring snows and rainwater. In the summer it breaks up into a cluster of separate lakes, and in years of drought Zharman may dry up. However, in years of good rainfall its level may rise significantly, connecting with Sarymoyyn and Zharkol lakes to the north and becoming a single body of water with a surface of over 100 square kilometers (39 sq mi).

== Flora and fauna ==
Typha and Phragmites reeds grow on the northern lakeshore. Fescue, gorse, wormwood, sedges and tall grasses cover the floodplain of the lake. Zharman is a stopover of bird migratory routes, with species such as swans, cranes, flamingos, geese and ducks finding a temporary habitat in the lake during their yearly migration. Among the fish species in the lake, the most abundant are the crucian carp and the perch.

== See also ==
- Central Asian Flyway
- List of lakes of Kazakhstan
