= Nauyrzym District =

Nauyrzym
- District
- Науырзым ауданы
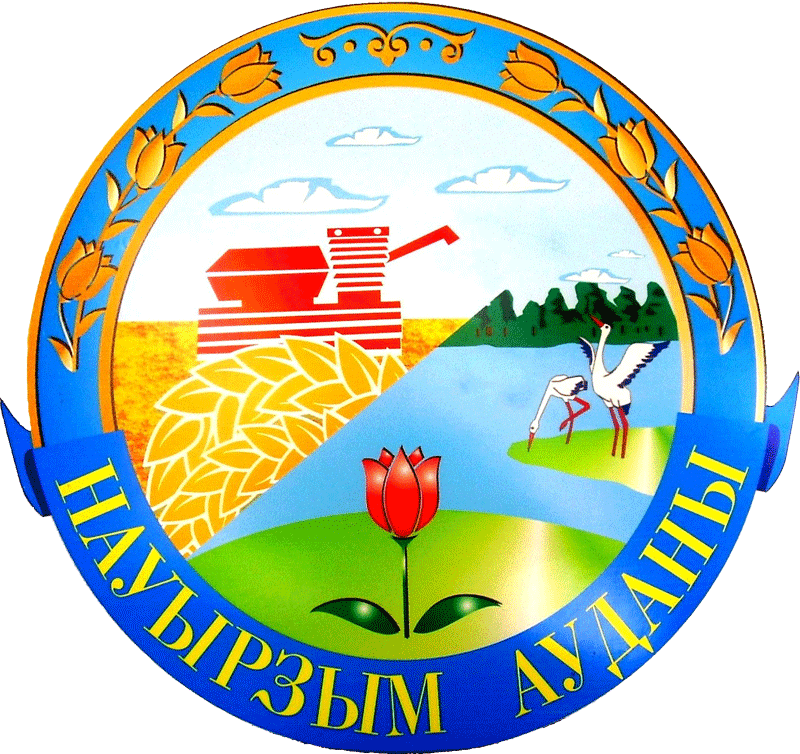
- Coat of arms

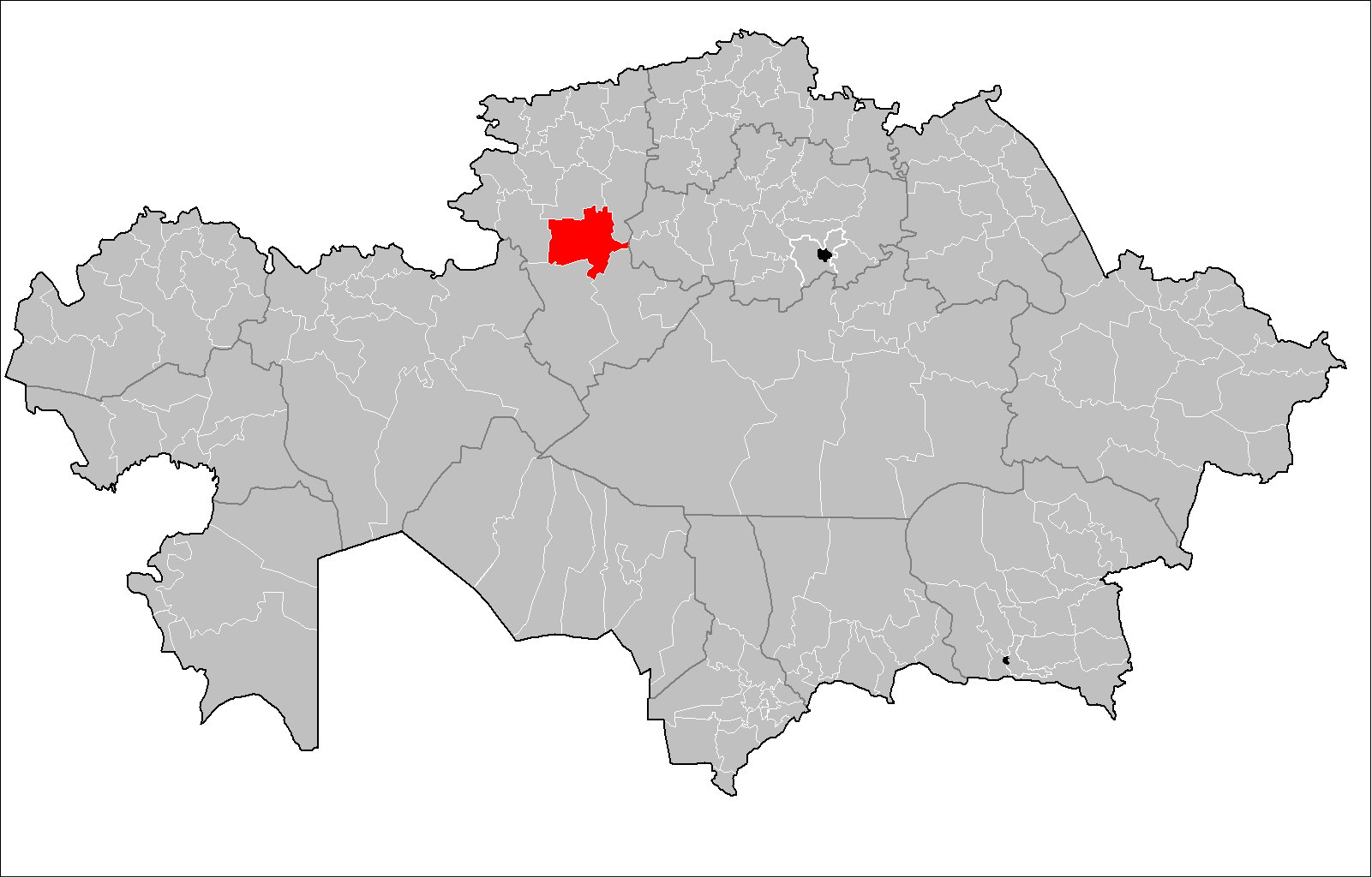
- Coordinates: 51°39′30″N 64°13′30″E
- Country: Kazakhstan
- Region: Kostanay Region
- Administrative center: Karamendy
- Established: 1965

Government
  - Akim: Abishev Kairat Tynymbaevich

Population (2013)
  - Total: 12,604
- Time zone: UTC+6 (East)
- Website: http://naurzum.kostanay.gov.kz

Nauyrzym (Kazakh: Науырзым ауданы, Nauyrzym audany) is a district of Kostanay Region in northern Kazakhstan. The administrative center of the district is the selo of Karamendy. Population: 12,604 (2013 estimate); 13,180 (2009 census results); 17,914 (1999 census results).

== Physical and geographical characteristics ==
It is located in the south in the middle part of the region. It borders in the north with Auliekol District, in the east with Kamysty District, in the south — with Amangeldi District and Zhangeldi District, in the west — with Karasu district and Zharkainsky district Akmola region. Aksuat, Zharman, Zhaksybay, Ulken Koskopa and Kishi Koskopa lakes, as well as the Ulken Damdi river, are located in the district.
