= Karamendy =

Karamendy Қарамеңді
- Village
- Location in Kazakhstan
- Coordinates: 51°39′38″N 64°13′32″E
- Country: Kazakhstan
- Region: Kostanay Region
- District: Naurzum District

Population (2019)
  - Total: 4,425
- Time zone: UTC+6 (East Kazakhstan Time)
- Post code: 111400

Karamendy (Kazakh: Қарамеңді; Russian: Караменды), until 1999 known as Dokuchayevka, is a village in Naurzum District, Kostanay Region, Kazakhstan. It is the administrative center of the Naurzum District, as well as of the Karamendy Rural District (KATO code - 395830100). Population: 4,694 (2009 census results); 5,326 (1999 census results). The administrative office of the Naurzum Nature Reserve, a protected area, is located in the village.

== Geography ==
Karamendy is located by road P-284, about 8 kilometers (5.0 mi) WNW of lake Zharman. Now abandoned Naurzum village is located 25 kilometers (16 mi) to the southeast.
