= Turgay Plateau =

Coordinates: 50.05°N 61.833334°E

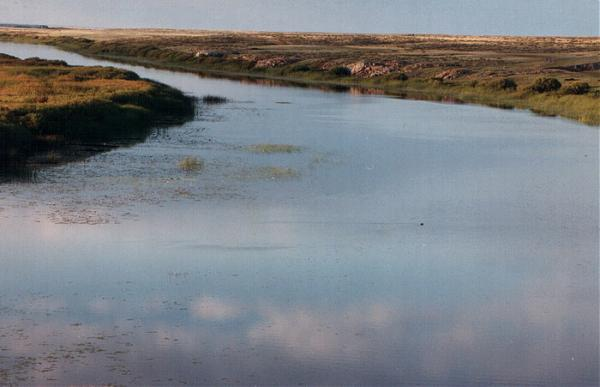
River Ishim near Derzhavinsk, Kazakhstan

The Turgay Plateau (Kazakh: Торғай Үстірті, romanized: Torğai Üstırtı; Russian: Тургайское плато) is a plateau in northwestern Kazakhstan. It lies 200–300 m above sea level.

It extends some 630 km (390 mi) north–south and 300 km (190 mi) east–west. It is bisected by the Turgay Depression which is 800 km long and during the last ice age provided an outlet for the extinct West Siberian Glacial Lake.

Between the Cretaceous and Eocene, the plateau was part of the Turgai Straits or West Siberian Sea, an extension of the Tethys Sea that separated Asia from Europe.
