= List of prisons =

This article provides a list of prisons by country.

== A ==
=== Afghanistan ===
For prisons in Afghanistan, see List of prisons in Afghanistan.

=== Algeria ===
- Serkadji Prison

=== Australia ===
For prisons in Australia, see List of prisons in Australia.

==== Australian Capital Territory ====
- Alexander Maconochie Centre
- Periodic Detention Centre

==== New South Wales ====
- Bathurst Correctional Centre
- Brewarrina (Yetta Dhinnakkal) Centre
- Broken Hill Correctional Centre
- Cessnock Correctional Centre
- Cooma Correctional Centre
- Defence Force Correctional Establishment
- Dillwynia Women's Correctional Centre
- Emu Plains Correctional Centre
- Glen Innes Correctional Centre
- Goulburn Correctional Centre
- Ivanhoe (Warakirri) Correctional Centre
- John Morony Correctional Complex
- Junee Correctional Centre
- Kirkconnell Correctional Centre
- Lithgow Correctional Centre
- Long Bay Correctional Centre
- Mannus Correctional Centre
- Metropolitan Remand and Reception Centre
- Mid North Coast Correctional Centre
- Mulawa Correctional Centre
- Oberon Correctional Centre
- Parklea Correctional Centre
- Silverwater Correctional Centre
- St Heliers Correctional Centre
- Tamworth Correctional Centre
- Wellington Correctional Centre

==== Northern Territory ====
- Alice Springs Correctional Centre
- Alice Springs Juvenile Holding Centre
- Berrimah Prison
- Darwin Correctional Centre
- Don Dale Youth Detention Centre
- Wildman River Wilderness Work Camp

==== Queensland ====
- Arthur Gorrie Correctional Centre
- Brisbane Correctional Centre
- Brisbane Women's Correctional Centre
- Capricornia Correctional Centre
- Lotus Glen Correctional Centre
- Maryborough Correctional Centre
- Numinbah Correctional Centre
- Palen Creek Correctional Centre
- Southern Queensland Correctional Centre
- Toowoomba Prison
- Townsville Correctional Centre
- Wolston Correctional Centre
- Woodford Correctional Centre

==== South Australia ====
- Adelaide Pre-Release Centre
- Adelaide Remand Centre
- Adelaide Women's Prison
- Cadell Training Centre
- Mobilong Prison
- Mount Gambier Prison
- Port Augusta Prison
- Port Lincoln Prison
- Yatala Labour Prison

==== Tasmania ====
- Ashley Youth Detention Centre
- Hobart Remand Centre
- Launceston Remand Centre
- Mary Hutchinson Women's Prison
- Risdon Prison Complex

==== Victoria ====
- Acheron Boys Home
- Beechworth Correctional Centre
- Dame Phyllis Frost Centre
- Fulham Correctional Centre
- HM Prison Barwon
- HM Prison Dhurringile
- HM Prison Langi Kal Kal
- HM Prison Loddon
- HM Prison Tarrengower
- Hopkins Correctional Centre (Ararat)
- Marngoneet Correctional Centre
- Melbourne Youth Justice Centre
- Metropolitan Remand Centre
- Port Phillip Prison
- Turana Youth Training Centre
- Ravenhall Prison

==== Western Australia ====
- Acacia Prison
- Albany Regional Prison
- Bandyup Women's Prison
- Banksia Hill Juvenile Detention Centre
- Boronia Pre-release Centre for Women
- Broome Regional Prison
- Bunbury Regional Prison
- Casuarina Prison
- Eastern Goldfields Regional Prison
- Greenough Regional Prison
- Hakea Prison
- Karnet Prison Farm
- Melaleuca Remand and Reintegration Facility
- Pardelup Prison Farm
- Roebourne Regional Prison
- Wandoo Reintegration Facility
- West Kimberley Regional Prison
- Wooroloo Prison Farm

=== Argentina ===
- Devoto Federal Prison
- Ezeiza Federal Prison Complex
- Ushuaia Penal Colony

== B ==
=== Bangladesh ===
- Barisal Central Jail
- Chittagong Central Jail
- Comilla Central Jail
- Dhaka Central Jail
- Jashore Central Jail
- Kashimpur Central Jail
- Mymensingh Central Jail
- Old Dhaka Central Jail (closed 2016, now a prison museum)
- Rajshahi Central Jail
- Rangpur Central Jail
- Sylhet Central Jail

=== Belgium ===
- Gevangenis Antwerpen
- Gevangenis Brugge
- Gevangenis Hasselt
- Gevangenis Gent
- Gevangenis Leuven Centraal
- Gevangenis Leuven Hulp
- Gevangenis Dendermonde
- Gevangenis Mechelen
- Gevangenis Hoogstraten
- Gevangenis Wortel
- Gevangenis Merksplas
- Gevangenis Turnhout
- Gevangenis Oudenaarde
- Gevangenis Ieper
- Gevangenis Ruiselede
- Gevangenis Beveren
- Berkendael Prison
- Forest Prison
- Haren Prison
- Lantin Prison
- Paive Prison
- Andenne Prison
- Namur Prison
- Saint-Gilles prison
- Prison d'Ittre

=== Bolivia ===
- San Pedro prison
- Palmasola

=== Botswana ===
- Kanye Prison (Kanye)
- Letlhakane Prison (Letlhakane)
- Lobatse Prison (Lobatse)
- Machaneng Prison (Machaneng)
- Mahalapye Prison (Mahalapye)
- Mochudi Prison (Mochudi)
- Molepolole Prison (Molepolole)
- Selebi Phikwe Prison (Selebi-Phikwe)
- Serowe New Prison (Serowe)
- Tsabong Prison(Tsabong)
- Boys Prison (Thamaga)
- Boro Prison (Maun)
- Ghanzi Prison (Ghanzi)
- Moshupa Boys Prison (Moshupa)

=== Brazil ===
- Carandiru Penitentiary (closed and demolished) - In 1992, the prison was the site of the Carandiru massacre.
- Presidente Bernardes Provisional Readaptation Center (Presidente Bernardes, São Paulo, Brazil) - inspired by the Supermax standards, although prisoners can only stay there for a maximum of 2 years.
- Catanduvas Federal Penitentiary (Catanduvas, Paraná, Brazil) - also based on the Supermax standards. It is the first federal prison in Brazil, designed to receive prisoners deemed too dangerous to be kept in the states' prison systems.
- Campo Grande Federal Penitentiary (Campo Grande, Mato Grosso do Sul, Brazil) - It houses the most dangerous prisoners in the country, as Fernandinho Beira-Mar, the Colombian trafficker Juan Carlos Ramírez Abadía and bicheiro João Arcanjo.
- Presidio of Ahu

== C ==
=== Cameroon ===
- Maroua Prison
- New Bell Prison, Douala
- Yoko Prison, Adamaoua

=== Chile ===
==== Bío Bío Region ====
- Chillán Public Prison, Chillán
- El Manzano, Concepción

==== Los Ríos Region ====
- Isla Teja Prison (closed), Valdivia
- Complejo Penitenciario de Valdivia, Valdivia

==== Santiago Metropolitan Region ====
- Ex Penitenciaría de Santiago, Santiago
- San Miguel Prison, Santiago
- Santiago Public Prison (closed), Santiago

=== China ===
- List of prisons in Anhui
- List of prisons in Beijing
- List of prisons in Chongqing
- List of prisons in Fujian
- List of prisons in Gansu
- List of prisons in Guangdong
- List of prisons in Guangxi
- List of prisons in Guizhou
- List of prisons in Hainan
- List of prisons in Hebei
- List of prisons in Heilongjiang
- List of prisons in Henan
- List of prisons in Hong Kong
- List of prisons in Hubei
- List of prisons in Hunan
- List of prisons in Inner Mongolia
- List of prisons in Jiangsu
- List of prisons in Jiangxi province
- List of prisons in Jilin
- List of prisons in Liaoning
- List of prisons in Ningxia
- List of prisons in Qinghai
- List of prisons in Shaanxi
- List of prisons in Shandong
- List of prisons in Shanghai
- List of prisons in Shanxi province
- List of prisons in Sichuan
- List of prisons in Tianjin
- List of prisons in the Tibet Autonomous Region
- List of prisons in Xinjiang
- List of prisons in Yunnan
- List of prisons in Zhejiang

==== Macau ====
- Coloane Prison - opened 1990
- Central Prison - closed 1990
- Ka Ho Prison - opened 2014

=== Croatia ===
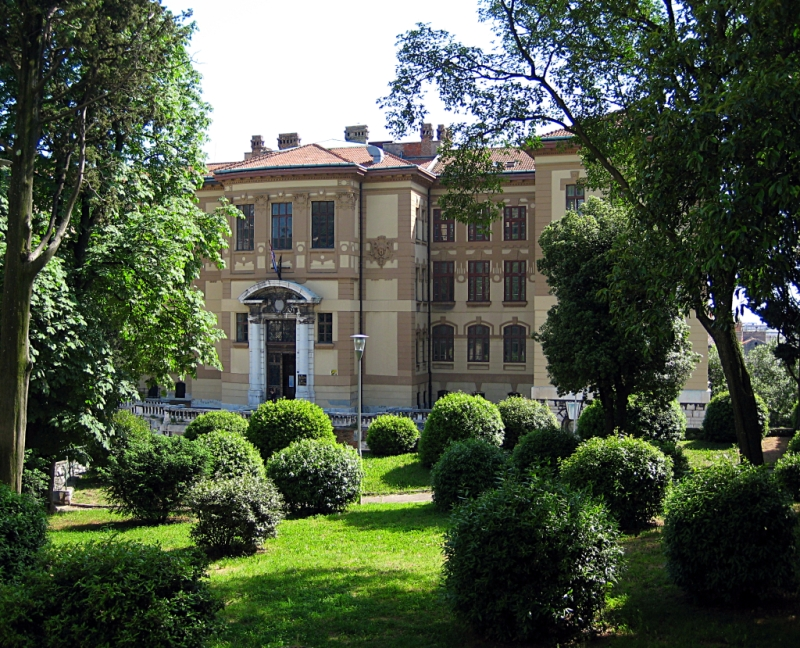
Court and prison in Rijeka (est. 1904)

== D ==
=== Denmark ===
- Blegdamsvej Prison
- Copenhagen Police Headquarters Prison
- Horsens Statsfængsel (closed 2006, now a prison museum)
- Horserød camp
- Institution of Herstedvester
- Nytorv Prison (for short-term imprisonment, a few hours or less, in between transport to/from another prison and sentencing at Copenhagen City Court)
- State Prison in Jyderup
- State Prison in Møgelkær (closed 2018, facilities maintained and can open again if necessary)
- State Prison in Nyborg
- State Prison in Renbæk
- State Prison in Ringe
- State Prison at Sdr. Omme
- State Prison at Søbysøgård
- State Prison in Vridsløselille (closed 2016)
- State Prison of Central Jutland
- State Prison of East Jutland
- State Prison of Kragskovhede
- Vestre Prison

== E ==
=== Ecuador ===
- Isla Isabela (historical, as penal colony)
- Prison 1, Quito

=== Egypt ===
- Scorpion Prison
- Tora Prison
- Wadi el-Natrun Prison

=== Eritrea ===
- Nakura, Dahlak Archipelago

=== Estonia ===
- Ämari Prison, Ämari (closed 2007)
- Fat Margaret (Paks Margareeta), Tallinn (1830s–1917)
- Haapsalu Castle (historic)
- Harju Gate, Tallinn (historic, demolished)
- Harku Prison, Harku (for women; founded 1920s)
- Jägala concentration camp, Jägala (1942–1943, during German occupation)
- Klooga concentration camp, Klooga (1943–1944, during German occupation)
- Lasnamäe Prison, Tallinn (19th century)
- Maardu Prison, Maardu (closed)
- Murru Prison, Rummu (maximum; founded 1938)
- Pagari street, Tallinn (1941, 1944–1991, during Soviet occupation)
- Pärnu Prison, Pärnu (closed)
- Patarei Prison (Tallinn Central Prison), Tallinn (closed, now Museum)
- Tallinn Prison, Tallinn (maximum; founded 1919)
- Tartu Prison, Tartu (maximum; founded 2000)
- Toompea Castle, Tallinn (in the beginning of 20th century)
- Vaivara concentration camp, Vaivara (1943–1944, during German occupation)
- Viljandi Prison, Viljandi (closed 2008)
- Viru Prison, Jõhvi (maximum; founded 2006)
- Võru Prison, Võru (defunct)

==== External links ====
- Official Website of Estonian Prison Service (in English)
- Official Website of Patarei Prison - Culture Park

== F ==
=== Finland ===
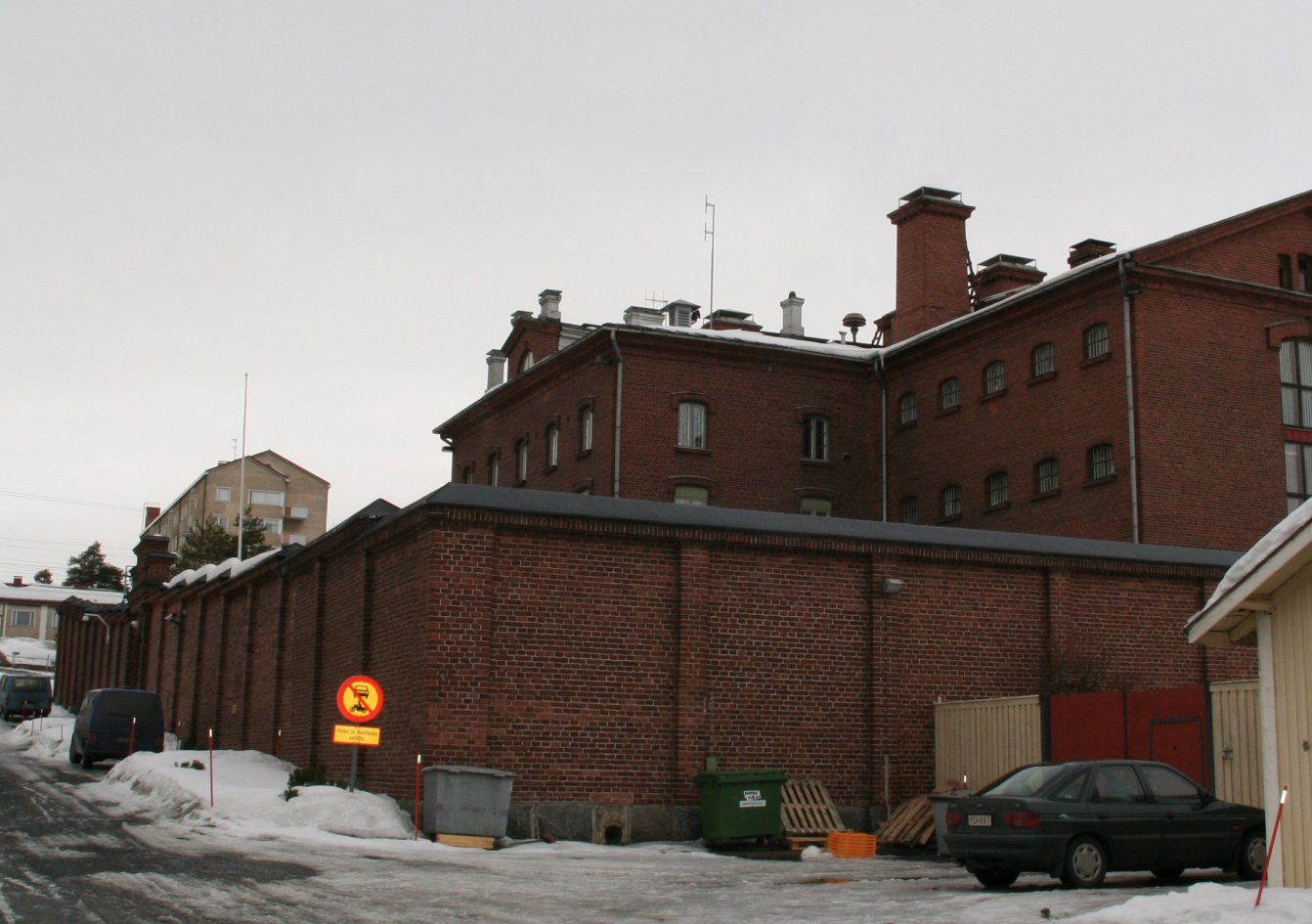
The prison in Kuopio, Northern Savonia

Best known prisons (mostly from 19th century or older, mainly still in function except the Katajanokka Prison and Kakola):

- former Helsinki County Prison or Katajanokka Prison, so called "Nokka" or "Skatta" (1749–2002)
- Sörnäinen Prison, so called "Sörkka", Helsinki
- Turku Prison (formerly 'Kakola', 1853–2007)
- Hämeenlinna Prison, Hämeenlinna (situated in Häme Castle until 1953)
- Oulu Prison, Oulu
- Riihimäki Prison, Riihimäki
- Sukeva Prison, Sonkajärvi
- Konnunsuo Prison, Konnunsuo, Lappeenranta (to be closed 2012)
- Pelso Prison, Vaala

==== External links ====
- Official Website of Finnish Prison Service (in English)

=== France ===
Listing from official website: http://www.justice.gouv.fr/minister/DAP/etablissement.htm (in French)

- The Bastille, Paris (historic)
- Château d'If, Marseille (historic)
- Bagne of Toulon (historic)
- Clairvaux Prison
- Fleury-Mérogis Prison
- Fresnes Prison, Fresnes, Val-de-Marne, near Paris
- La Santé Prison, Paris
- Leandro Prison, Montpellier

== G ==
=== Germany ===
For a longer list of prisons in Germany see Liste der Justizvollzugsanstalten in Deutschland (in German)

- Brandenburg-Görden Prison (now part of a larger complex called Justizvollzugsanstalt Brandenburg an der Havel)
- Ebrach Abbey
- Hohenasperg
- Hoheneck women's prison
- Landsberg Prison
- Spandau Prison, Berlin (demolished; had only one prisoner during its final 11 years)
- Stammheim Prison
- Werl Prison, Werl

=== Ghana ===
There are 45 Prisons in Ghana which are managed by the Ghana Prisons Service. In all there are 14,324 prisoners of which 14,125 are males and 199 are females.

- Nsawam Prison
- Kumasi Prison
- Ho Prison
- Sunyani Prison

=== Greece ===
- Korydallos Prison, Korydallos
- Ioannia Prison, Ioannia
- Komotini Prison, Komotini
- Corinth Prison, Corinth
- Thessaloniki Prison, Thessaloniki
- Larissa Prison, Larissa
- Nafplio Prison, Nafplio
- Neapolis Prison, Neapolis
- Tripoli Prison, Tripoli
- Chania Prison, Chania
- Chios Prison, Chios
- Kos Prison, Kos
- Amfissa Preventorium For Prisoners, Amfissa

== H ==
=== Hungary ===
- Állampusztai Országos Büntetés-végrehajtási Intézet, Állampuszta
- Balassagyarmati Fegyház és Börtön, Balassagyarmat
- Budapesti Fegyház és Börtön, Budapest
- Fiatalkorúak Büntetés-végrehajtási Intézete, Tököl, Szirmabesenyő, Kecskemét
- Kalocsai Börtön, Kalocsa
- Márianosztrai Fegyház és Börtön, Márianosztra
- Nagyfai Országos Büntetés-végrehajtási Intézet, Algyő-nagyfa
- Pálhalmai Országos Büntetés-végrehajtási Intézet, Dunaújváros-pálhalma
- Sátoraljaújhelyi Fegyház és Börtön, Sátoraljaújhely
- Sopronkőhidai Fegyház és Börtön, Sopronkőhida
- Szegedi Fegyház és Börtön, Szeged Csillagbörtön / Star Prison
- Tiszalöki Országos Büntetés-végrehajtási Intézet, Tiszalök
- Váci Fegyház és Börtön, Vác

== I ==
=== Indonesia ===
- Banceuy Prison, Bandung (defunct)
- Kambangan Island
- Kerobokan Prison, Bali
- Denpasar Prison, Denpasar
- Cipinang Penitentiary Institution, Jakarta

=== Iran ===
- Ahvaz
  - Ahvaz Central Prison (Sheyban AKA Shiban prison)
  - Ahvaz Sepidar Prison
  - Karun (closed)
  - Sepah Yekkom (Detention Center operated by Ministry of Intelligence)
- Bandar Abbas: Bandar Abbas Prison, Hormozgan Province
- Fashafoyeh: See below: Tehran, Central Prison of Tehran
- Kahrizak: Kahrizak Prison
- Karaj
  - Fardis Prison "Kachoei prison"
  - Ghezel Hesar Prison
  - Rajayi-shahr Prison, AKA Gohardasht prison
- Kashan: Kashan Prison
- Kerman: Shahab prison
- Kermanshah
  - Dizel Abad Prison
  - Naft Square Detention Center (operated by Ministry of Intelligence)
- Khorramabad
  - Khorramabad Central Prison
  - Falak-ol-Aflak Castle (historic)
- Khoy: Khoy Prison, West Azerbaijan Province
- Mahabad: Mahabad Prison
- Mashhad: Vakil-Abad (Central) Prison
- Qarchak: Qarchak Women's Prison (Shahr-e Rey prison, also known as "Gharchak Women's Prison" or Varamin prison)
- Rasht: Rasht Central Prison, Gilan Province
- Sanandaj
  - Sanandaj Central Prison
  - Sanandaj Intelligence Office detention center (operated by Ministry of Intelligence)
- Sari: Sari Central Prison, Mazandaran Province
- Shiraz:
  - Adel Abad Prison
  - Seppah Prison
- Tabriz: Tabriz Prison, East Azerbaijan Province
- Tehran
  - Ghezel Ghale Prison
  - Central Prison of Tehran, Fashafoyeh
  - Evin Prison
    - Prison 209 or "section 209 of the Evin Prison" (operated by Ministry of Intelligence)
    - Prison 59 (operated by Sepah-e Pasdaran IRGC)
    - Ward 2A, or Section 2A of Evin prison (operated by Sepah-e Pasdaran IRGC)
  - Heshmatiyeh Prison (operated by Sepah-e Pasdaran IRGC)
  - Qasr Prison (historic)
  - Shapour detention centre operated by Iranian Police Criminal Investigation Department (Agahi)
  - Towhid Prison (historic)
  - Vozara Detention Center
- Urmia: Orumiyeh Central Prison, Darya prison
- Zabol: Zabol Central Prison
- Zahedan: Zahedan Prison

=== Iraq ===
- Abu Ghraib prison, Baghdad
- Nugra Salman Prison, Muthanna Governorate

=== Ireland ===
- Arbour Hill Prison, Dublin 7
- Castlerea Prison, Castlerea, County Roscommon
- Cloverhill Prison, Dublin 22
- Cork Prison, Cork
- Dóchas Centre, Mountjoy Campus, Dublin 7
- Kilmainham Gaol (closed)
- Limerick Prison, Limerick
- Loughan House, County Cavan
- Midlands Prison, County Laois
- Mountjoy Prison, Mountjoy Campus, Dublin 7
- Newgate Prison, Dublin (closed)
- Portlaoise Prison, Portlaoise, County Laois
- Richmond General Penitentiary, Grangegorman, Dublin 7 (closed)
- Shelton Abbey, Arklow, County Wicklow
- St. Patrick's Institution, Mountjoy Campus, Dublin 7
- Training Unit, Mountjoy Campus, Dublin 7
- Wheatfield Prison, Dublin 22

=== Israel ===
- Maasiyahu Prison
- Megiddo prison
- Nitzan Detention Center
- Hadarim Detention Center
- Ktzi'ot Prison
- Ramot Prison
- Magen Prison
- Be'er Sheva Prison
- Eshel Prison
- Prison Four
- Dekel Prison
- Kishon Detention Center
- Shikma Prison
- Maskoveieh
- Ketziot Military Prison/Ktzi'ot Prison
- Prison Six
- Nafha Prison
- Neve Tirtza Women's Prison
- Ayalon Prison
- Ofer Prison
- Giv'on Prison
- Rimonim Prison
- Damun Prison
- Gilboa Prison
- Tzalmon Prison
- Hermon Prison
- Shata Prison
- HaSharon Prison
- Ashmoret Prison
- Carmel Prison

=== Italy ===
- Asinara Prison, Sassari
- Bollate Prison, Milan
- Regina Coeli, Rome
- Rebibbia, Rome
- Forte Boccea, Rome
- Ucciardone, Palermo
- San Vittore, Milan
- Opera, Milan
- Giudecca, Venice
- Casa di reclusione, Fossano
- Casa circondariale di Marassi, Genoa
- Casa di reclusione, Eboli
- Istituto a custodia attenuata per madri, Turin
- Istituto a custodia attenuata, Empoli
- Casa circondariale di Rimini, Rimini
- Casa circondariale di Forlì, Forlì
- Casa di reclusione, Orvieto
- Casa circondariale di Pistoia, Pistoia
- Casa circondariale di Giarre, Catania
- Istituto a custodia attenuata per madri, Cagliari
- Casa di reclusione di Altamura, Bari
- Sollicciano, Florence
- Lorusso e Cutugno Prison, Turin
- Uta, Cagliari
- Santa Maria Capua Vetere Prison, Santa Maria Capua Vetere
- Canton Mombello Prison, Brescia

== J ==
=== Japan ===
==== Sapporo Correctional Precinct ====
- Sapporo Prison 札幌刑務所 - Higashi-ku, Sapporo
  - Sapporo Prison Sapporo Branch 札幌刑務所札幌刑務支所 - Higashi-ku, Sapporo
- Asahikawa Prison 旭川刑務所 - Asahikawa, Hokkaidō
- Obihiro Prison 帯広刑務所 - Obihiro, Hokkaidō
  - Obihiro Prison Kushiro Branch 帯広刑務所釧路刑務支所 - Kushiro, Hokkaidō
- Abashiri Prison 網走刑務所 - Abashiri, Hokkaidō
- Tsukigata Prison 月形刑務所 - Tsukigata, Hokkaidō
- Hakodate Juvenile Prison 函館少年刑務所 - Hakodate, Hokkaidō

==== Sendai Correctional Precinct ====
- Aomori Prison 青森刑務所 - Aomori, Aomori
- Miyagi Prison 宮城刑務所 - Wakabayashi-ku, Sendai
- Akita Prison 秋田刑務所 - Akita City
- Yamagata Prison 山形刑務所 - Yamagata, Yamagata
- Fukushima Prison 福島刑務所 - Fukushima, Fukushima
  - Fukushima Prison Fukushima Branch 福島刑務所福島刑務支所 - Morioka, Iwate
- Morioka Juvenile Prison 盛岡少年刑務所 - Morioka, Iwate

==== Tokyo Correctional Precinct ====
- Tokyo Detention House 東京拘置所 - Katsushika, Tokyo
- Mito Prison 水戸刑務所 - Hitachinaka, Ibaraki
- Tochigi Prison 栃木刑務所 - Tochigi, Tochigi
- Kurobane Prison 黒羽刑務所 - Ōtawara, Tochigi
- Maebashi Prison 前橋刑務所 - Maebashi, Gunma
- Chiba Prison 千葉刑務所 - Wakaba-ku, Chiba
- Ichihara Prison 市原刑務所 - Ichihara, Chiba
- Fuchu Prison 府中刑務所 - Fuchū, Tokyo
- Yokohama Prison 横浜刑務所 - Kōnan-ku, Yokohama
  - Yokohama Prison Yokosuka Branch 横浜刑務所横須賀刑務支所 - Yokosuka, Kanagawa
- Niigata Prison 新潟刑務所 - Kōnan-ku, Niigata
- Kofu Prison 甲府刑務所 - Kōfu, Yamanashi
- Nagano Prison 長野刑務所 - Suzaka, Nagano
- Shizuoka Prison 静岡刑務所 - Aoi-ku, Shizuoka
- Kawagoe Juvenile Prison 川越少年刑務所 - Kawagoe, Saitama
- Matsumoto Juvenile Prison 松本少年刑務所 - Matsumoto, Nagano

==== Nagoya Correctional Precinct ====
- Nagoya Detention House 名古屋拘置所 - Higashi-ku, Nagoya
- Toyama Prison 富山刑務所 - Toyama City
- Kanazawa Prison 金沢刑務所 - Kanazawa, Ishikawa
- Fukui Prison 福井刑務所 - Fukui, Fukui
- Gifu Prison 岐阜刑務所 - Gifu, Gifu
- Kasamatsu Prison 笠松刑務所 - Kasamatsu, Gifu
- Nagoya Prison 名古屋刑務所 - Miyoshi, Aichi
  - Nagoya Prison Toyohashi Branch 名古屋刑務所豊橋刑務支所 - Toyohashi, Aichi
- Mie Prison 三重刑務所 - Tsu, Mie

==== Osaka Correctional Precinct ====
- Osaka Detention House 大阪拘置所 - Miyakojima-ku, Osaka
- Shiga Prison 滋賀刑務所 - Ōtsu, Shiga
- Kyoto Prison 京都刑務所 - Yamashina-ku, Kyoto
- Osaka Prison 大阪刑務所 - Sakai-ku, Sakai
- Kobe Prison 神戸刑務所 - Akashi, Hyōgo
- Kakogawa Prison 加古川刑務所 - Kakogawa, Hyōgo
- Wakayama Prison 和歌山刑務所 - Wakayama, Wakayama
- Himeji Prison 姫路少年刑務所 - Himeji, Hyōgo
- Nara Juvenile Prison 奈良少年刑務所 - Nara, Nara

==== Hiroshima Correctional Precinct ====
- Hiroshima Detention House 広島拘置所 - Naka-ku, Hiroshima
- Tottori Prison 鳥取刑務所 - Tottori, Tottori
- Matsue Prison 松江刑務所 - Matsue, Shimane
- Okayama Prison 岡山刑務所 - Kita-ku, Okayama
- Hiroshima Prison 広島刑務所 - Naka-ku, Hiroshima
  - Hiroshima Prison Onomichi Branch 広島刑務所尾道刑務支所 - Onomichi, Hiroshima
- Yamaguchi Prison 山口刑務所 - Yamaguchi, Yamaguchi
- Iwakuni Prison 岩国刑務所 - Iwakuni, Yamaguchi

==== Takamatsu Correctional Precinct ====
- Tokuchima Prison 徳島刑務所 - Tokushima, Tokushima
- Takamatsu Prison 高松刑務所 - Takamatsu, Kagawa
- Matsuyama Prison 松山刑務所 - Tōon, Ehime
  - Matsuyama Prison Saijo Branch 松山刑務所西条刑務支所 - Saijō, Ehime
- Kochi Prison 高知刑務所 - Kōchi, Kōchi

==== Fukuoka Correctional Precinct ====
- Fukuoka Detention House 福岡拘置所 - Sawara-ku, Fukuoka
- Fukuoka Prison 福岡刑務所 - Umi, Fukuoka
- Fumoto Prison 麓刑務所 - Tosu, Saga
- Sasebo Prison 佐世保刑務所 - Sasebo, Nagasaki
- Nagasaki Prison 長崎刑務所 - Isahaya, Nagasaki
- Kumamoto Prison 熊本刑務所 - Kumamoto, Kumamoto
- Oita Prison 大分刑務所 - Ōita, Ōita
- Miyazaki Prison 宮崎刑務所 - Miyazaki, Miyazaki
- Kagoshima Prison 鹿児島刑務所 - Yūsui, Kagoshima
- Okinawa Prison 沖縄刑務所 - Nanjō, Okinawa
  - Okinawa Prison Yaeyama Branch 沖縄刑務所八重山刑務支所 - Ishigaki, Okinawa
- Saga Juvenile Prison 佐賀少年刑務所 - Saga, Saga

==== Medical Prison ====
- Hachioji Medical Prison 八王子医療刑務所 - Hachiōji, Tokyo
- Okazaki Medical Prison 岡崎医療刑務所 - Okazaki, Aichi
- Osaka Medical Prison 大阪医療刑務所 - Sakai-ku, Sakai
- Kitakyushu Medical Prison 北九州医療刑務所 - Kokuraminami-ku, Kitakyūshū

==== Social Rehabilitation Program Center（Private Finance Initiative, PFI system） ====
- Mine Rehabilitation Program Center 美祢社会復帰促進センター - Mine, Yamaguchi
- Kitsuregawa Rehabilitation Program Center 喜連川社会復帰促進センター - Sakura, Tochigi
- Harima Rehabilitation Program Center -播磨社会復帰促進センター - Kakogawa, Hyōgo
- Shimane Asahi Rehabilitation Program Center 島根あさひ社会復帰促進センター - Hamada, Shimane

== K ==
=== Kuwait ===
- Sulaibiya Central Prison

== L ==
=== Laos ===
- Phonthong Prison, near Vientiane
- Samkhe Prison, near Vientiane

=== Libya ===
- Abu Salim prison, Tripoli

=== Lithuania ===
- Lukiškės Prison, Vilnius
- Kaunas Prison, Kaunas

== M ==
=== Madagascar ===
- Antanimora Prison, Antananarivo
- Farafangana prison, Farafangana

=== Malawi ===
- Zomba Central Prison, Zomba
- Maula Prison, Lilongwe
- Chichiri Prison, Blantyre
- Mzimba Prison, Mzimba

=== Malaysia ===
- Perlis Correctional Centre
- Pokok Sena Prison
- Alor Setar Prison
- Sungai Petani Prison
- Penang Remand Prison
- Seberang Perai Prison
- Kamunting Detention Centre
- Taiping Prison
- Batu Gajah Correctional Centre
- Tapah Prison
- Sungai Buloh Prison
- Kajang Prison
- Kajang Women's Prison
- Seremban Prison
- Jelebu Drug Rehabilitation Institution
- Bandar Hilir Prison
- Sungai Udang Prison
- Dusun Dato' Murad Pre-Release Prison
- Henry Gurney School Telok Mas
- Johor Bahru Remand Prison
- Muar Correctional Centre
- Simpang Renggam Prison
- Kluang Prison
- Penor Prison
- Bentong Prison
- Marang Prison
- Machang Correctional Centre
- Pengkalan Chepa Prison
- Puncak Borneo Prison
- Sri Aman Central Prison
- Sibu Central Prison
- Miri Central Prison
- Limbang Central Prison
- Kota Kinabalu Central Prison
- Kota Kinabalu Women's Prison
- Sandakan Prison
- Tawau Central Prison
- Henry Gurney School Keningau

=== Malta ===
- Corradino Correctional Facility, Paola
- Gozo Prison, Victoria (defunct)
- Gran Prigione (Slaves' Prison), Valletta (defunct)

Many of the fortifications, such as Fort Saint Elmo and Fort Ricasoli, were also used as prisons at some point.

=== Mexico ===
- Cefereso No. 9, Ciudad Juarez
- Federal Social Readaptation Center No. 1, Almoloya de Juarez
- Palacio de Lecumberri, Mexico City (defunct)
- Penal del Altiplano, Almoloya de Juarez
- Islas Marías Federal Prison, Marías Islands
- La Mesa Prison, Tijuana

=== Monaco ===
- Remand Prison of Monaco

=== Morocco ===
- Tazmamart, Atlas Mountains (defunct)

== N ==
=== Netherlands ===
- Zaanstad
- Rotterdam
- Veenhuizen
- Esserheem
- Zwolle

=== North Korea ===
==== Operating political prison camps ====
- Kwan-li-so No. 14 Kaechon
- Kwan-li-so No. 15 Yodok
- Kwan-li-so No. 16 Hwasong
- Kwan-li-so No. 18 Bukchang
- Kwan-li-so No. 22 Haengyong
- Kwan-li-so No. 25 Chongjin

==== Former political prison camps ====
- Kwan-li-so No. 12 Onsong

==== Operating reeducation camps ====
- Kyo-hwa-so No. 1 Kaechon
- Kyo-hwa-so No. 3 Sinuiju
- Kyo-hwa-so No. 4 Kangdong
- Kyo-hwa-so No. 8 Yongdam
- Kyo-hwa-so No. 11 Chungsan
- Kyo-hwa-so No. 12 Chongori
- Kyo-hwa-so No. 15 Hamhung
- Kyo-hwa-so No. 22 Oro
- Kyo-hwa-so No. 77 Danchun
- Kyo-hwa-so Hoeryong

==== Former reeducation camps ====
- Kyo-hwa-so Sŭnghori

=== Norway ===
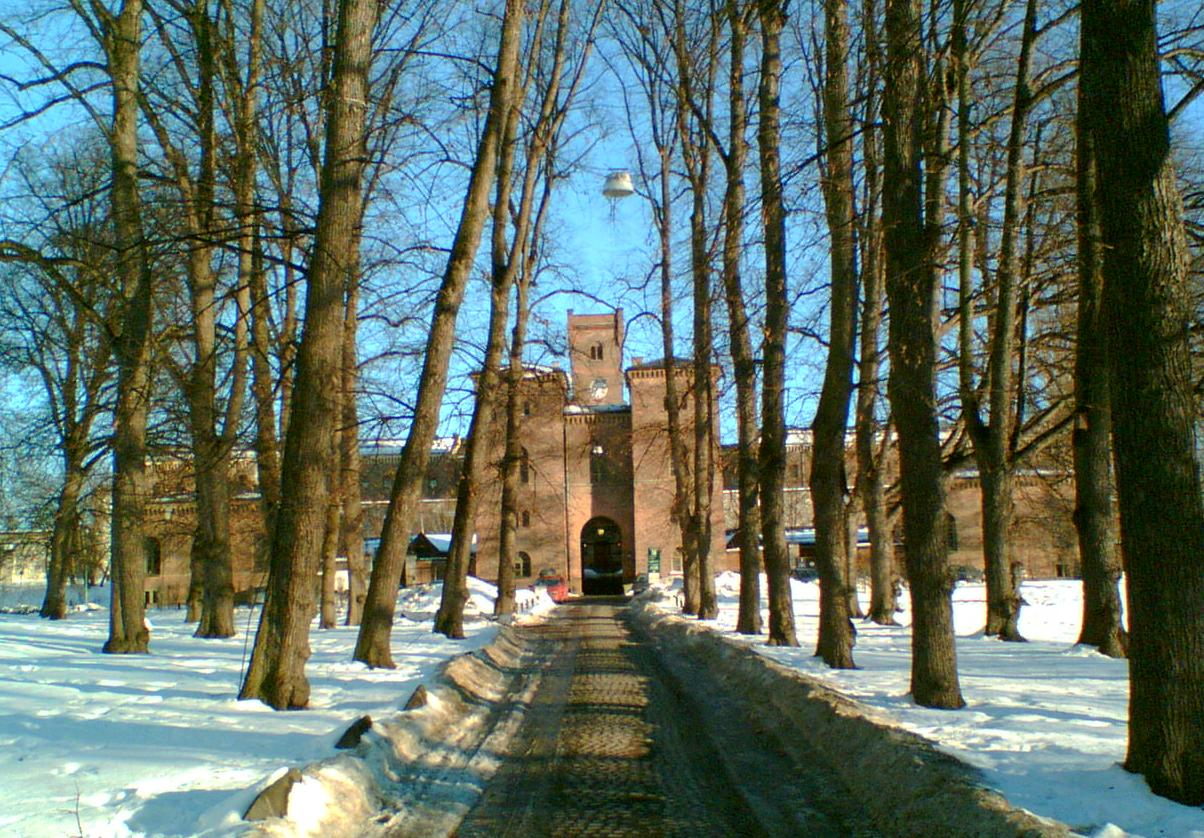
Oslo Prison (est. 1851)

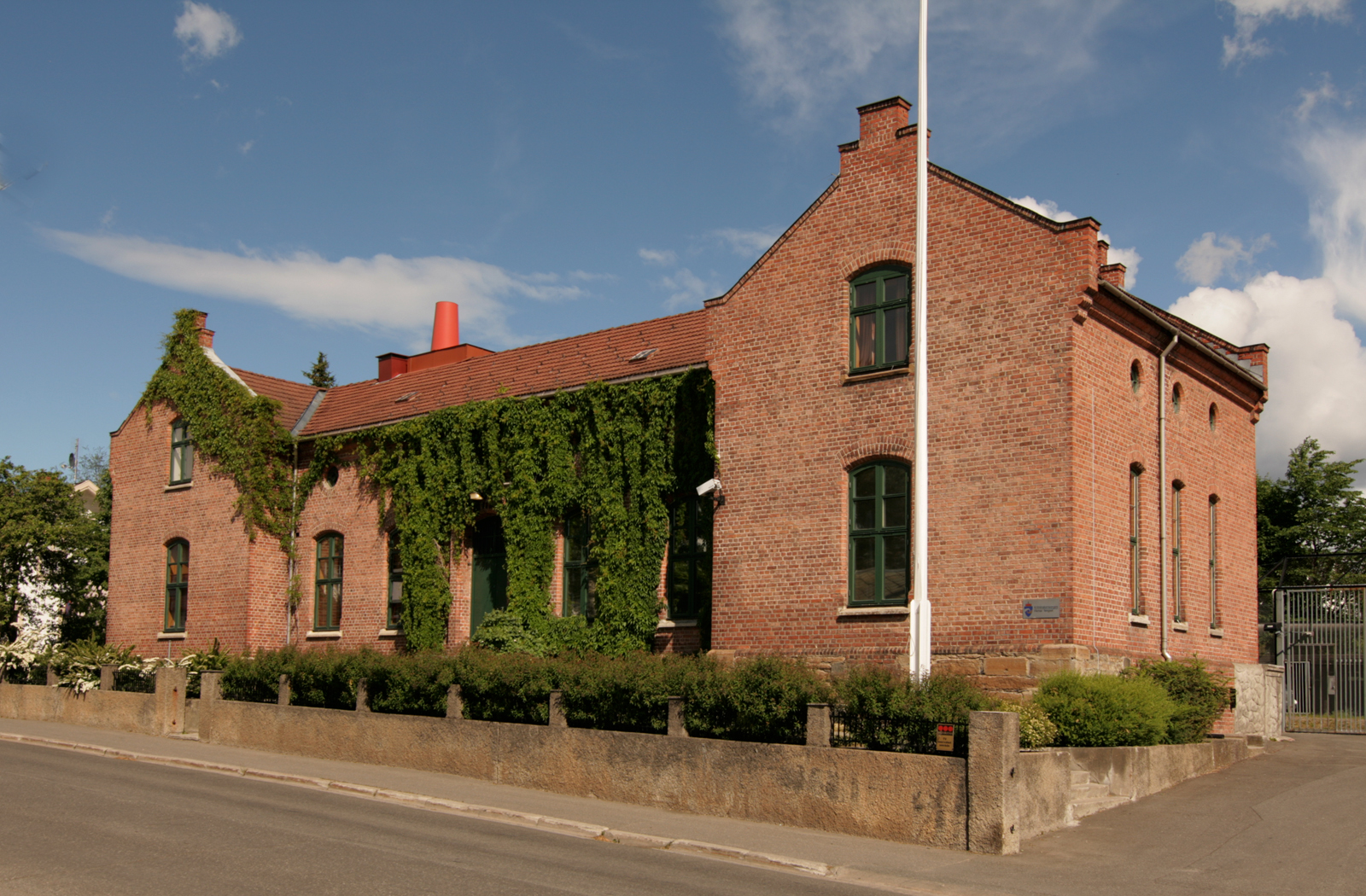
Hamar Prison (est. 1864)

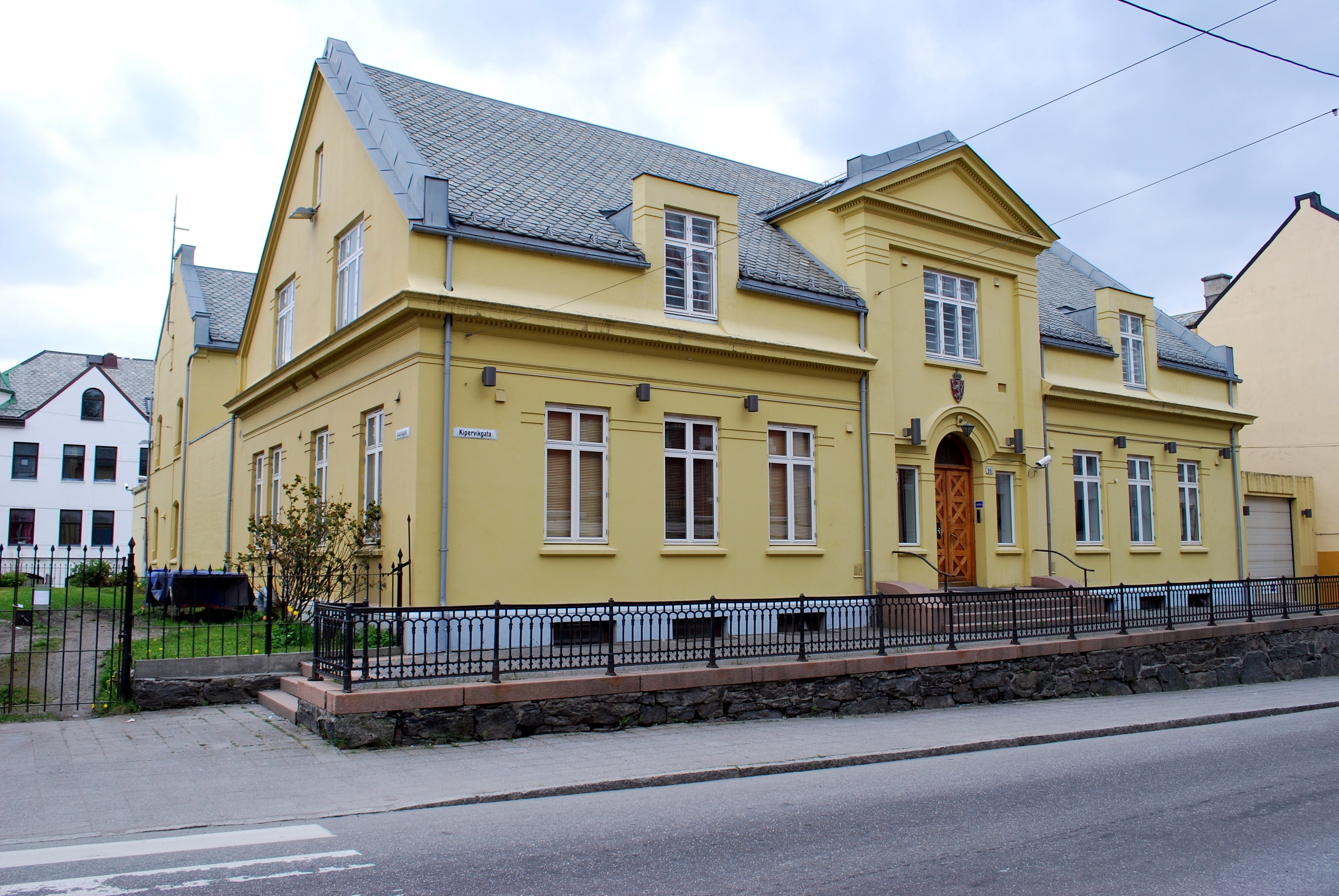
Ålesund Prison (est. 1864/1906)

- Arendal Prison
- Bastøy Prison
- Berg Prison
- Bergen Prison
- Bjørgvin Prison
- Bodø Prison
- Bredtveit Detention and Security Prison
- Bruvoll Prison
- Drammen Prison
- Fredrikstad Prison
- Gjøvik Prison
- Halden Prison (New 2010)
- Hamar Prison
- Hassel Prison
- Haugesund Prison
- Hof Prison
- Horten Prison
- Hustad Prison
- Ila Detention and Security Prison
- Ilseng Prison
- Indre Østfold Prison
- Kongsvinger Prison
- Kragerø Prison
- Kristiansand Prison
- Larvik Prison
- Mosjøen Prison
- Moss Prison
- Oslo Prison
- Ravneberget Prison
- Ringerike Prison
- Sandefjord Prison
- Sandeid Prison
- Sarpsborg Prison
- Sem Prison
- Skien Prison
- Stavanger Prison
- Tromsø Prison
- Trondheim Prison
- Ullersmo Prison
- Vadsø Prison
- Verdal Prison
- Vestre Slidre Prison
- Vik Prison
- Ålesund Prison
- Åna Prison

== P ==
=== Pakistan ===
==== Sindh ====
- Karachi Central Jail, Karachi
- Hyderabad Jail, Hyderabad
- Sukkar Jail (old), Sukkar
- Sukkar Jail (new), Sukkar
- Larkana Jail, Larkana
- Khairpur Jail, Khairpur
- Malir Jail, Karachi
- Nawabshah Jail, Nawabshah
- Mirpurkhas Jail, Mirpurkhas
- Sanghar Jail, Sanghar
- Jacobabad Jail, Jacobabad
- Dadu Jail, Dadu
- Badin Jail, Badin
- Shikarpur Jail, Shikarpur
- Nara Jail, Hyderabad
- Women's Jail, Karachi
- Women's Jail, Hyderabad

==== Punjab ====
- Central Jail Lahore (at Kot Lakhpat)
- Central Jail Gujranwala
- Central Jail Sahiwal
- District Jail Lahore
- District Jail Sheikhupura
- District Jail Kasur
- District Jail Sialkot
- New Central Jail Multan
- New Central Jail Bahawalpur
- Borstal Institution and Juvenile Jail Bahawalpur
- Central Jail Dera Ghazi Khan
- District Jail Multan
- District Jail Rajanpur
- District Jail Vehari
- Women Jail Multan
- District Jail Rahim Yar Khan
- District Jail Bahawalnagar
- District Jail Muzaffar Garh
- Central Jail Rawalpindi
- District Jail Attock
- District Jail Jhelum
- District Jail Mandi Bahauddin
- District Jail Gujrat
- Sub Jail Chakwal
- Central Jail Faisalabad
- Central Jail Mianwali
- Borstal Institution and Juvenile Jail Faisalabad
- District Jail Faisalabad
- District Jail Jhang
- District Jail Toba Tek Singh
- District Jail Sargodha
- District Jail Shahpur

=== Papua New Guinea ===
There are 21 prisons and 10 rural lockups in Papua New Guinea:

- Ambunti Rural Lockup
- Angoram Rural Lockup
- Baisu Prison
- Baiyer Rural Lockup
- Barawagi Prison
- Beikut Prison
- Beon Prison
- Bihute Prison
- Biru Prison
- Bogia Rural Lockup
- Bomana Prison
- Boram Prison
- Bui-Iebi Prison
- Buimo Prison
- Bundaira Prison
- Finshafen Rural Lockup
- Giligili Prison
- Hutzena Rural Lockup
- Kavieng Prison
- Kerevat Prison
- Lakiemata Prison
- Manus Prison
- Maprik Rural Lockup
- Menyamia Rural Lockup
- Misima Rural Lockup
- Ningerum Prison
- Vanimo Prison

=== Poland ===
- Kraków-Podgórze Detention Centre
- Mokotów Prison
- Montelupich Prison
- Wronki Prison

=== Peru ===
- Barbadillo Prison
- Callao Prison
- Miguel Castro Castro prison
- Santa Mónica Prison

== R ==
=== Romania ===
- Aiud Prison, Aiud
- Gherla Prison, Gherla
- Pitești Prison, Pitești

=== Russia ===
==== Remand prisons ====
- Butyrka Prison, Moscow
- Corrective colony No. 2, Mordovia
- Corrective colony No. 2, Vladimir Oblast
- Matrosskaya Tishina, Moscow
- Kresty Prison, Saint Petersburg
- Biysk Prison, Biysk
- Yekaterinburg Remand Prison, Yekaterinburg
- Makhachkala Prison, Makhachkala
- Simferpol Prison, Simferopol

==== Former KGB remand prisons ====
- Lubyanka Prison, Moscow
- Lefortovo Prison, Moscow
- Bolshoy Dom, Saint Petersburg

==== Maximum security prisons ====
- Pyatak Prison, Ognenny Ostrov
- Vladimir Central Prison, Vladimir
- Samara Penitentiary, Samara
- Black Dolphin Prison, Sol-Iletsk
- White Swan (prison), Solikamsk
- Black Eagle Prison, Ivdel
- Snowy Owl Prison, Kharp
- Saransk Prison, Saransk
- Sosnovka Prison, Sosnovka
- Saratov Prison, Saratov
- Petek Island Prison
- Mordovia Prison, Mordovia
- Minusinskaya Prison, Minusinsk
- Tomsk Prison, Tomsk
- Volgograd Prison, Volgograd
- Kopeysk Prison, Kopeysk
- Ryazan Prison, Ryazan
- Krasnodar Prison, Krasnodar
- Petrozavodsk Prison, Petrozavodsk
- Yekaterinburg Prison, Yekaterinburg
- Tula Prison, Shchyokino (town), Tula Oblast
- Priuralsky Prison, Priuralsky District

== S ==
=== Saudi Arabia ===
- al-Ha'ir Prison, near Riyadh
- Jeddah Prison, Jeddah
- Rafha Prison, Rafha
- ʽUlaysha Prison, Mabahith prison in Riyadh

=== Singapore ===
Prisons

- Changi Prison Complex
- Changi Women's Prison and Drug Rehabilitation Centre
- Selarang Park Community Supervision Centre
- Tanah Merah Prison

Drug Rehabilitation Centres

- Changi Women's Prison and Drug Rehabilitation Centre

Former prisons and detention centres

- Admiralty West Prison
- Outram Prison
- Changi Prison
- Moon Crescent Prison
- Queenstown Remand Prison
- Portsdown Prison
- Tampines Prison
- Sembawang Drug Rehabilitation Centre
- Khalsa Crescent Prison
- Kaki Bukit Centre
- Bedok Reformative Centre
- Lloyd Leas Work Release Camp

=== Slovakia ===
- Ilava Prison, Ilava
- Leopoldov Prison, Leopoldov

=== Spain ===
==== Operational prisons ====
- A Lama Prison, A Lama, Pontevedra
- Alhaurín de la Torre Prison, Alhaurín de la Torre, Málaga
- Albacete Prison, Albacete
- Albocàsser Prison, Albocàsser, Castellón
- Albolote Prison, Albolote, Granada
- Alcalá de Guadaira Prison, Alcalá de Guadaira, Seville
- Alcalá-Meco Prison, Alcalá de Henares, Community of Madrid
- Alcázar de San Juan Prison, Alcázar de San Juan, Ciudad Real
- Alicante Prison, Alicante
- Alicante II Prison, Villena, Alicante
- Almería Prison, Almería
- Aranjuez Prison, Aranjuez, Community of Madrid
- Arrecife de Lanzarote Prison, Teguise, Las Palmas
- Ávila Prison, Brieva, Ávila
- Badajoz Prison, Badajoz
- Barcelona Model Prison, Barcelona
- Bilbao Prison, Basauri, Biscay
- Botafuegos Prison, Algeciras, Cádiz
- Bonxe Prison, Outeiro de Rei, Lugo
- Burgos Prison, Burgos
- Cáceres Prison, Cáceres
- Can Brians Prison, Sant Esteve Sesrovires, Barcelona
- Castellón Prison, Castellón de la Plana
- Centro Penitenciario de Valencia Prison, Picassent, Valencia
- Ceuta Prison, Ceuta
- Córdoba Prison, Córdoba
- Daroca Prison, Daroca, Zaragoza
- El Dueso Prison, Dueso, Santoña, Cantabria
- Figueres Prison, Figueres, Girona
- Girona Prison, Girona
- Estremera Prison, Estremera, Community of Madrid
- Herrera de la Mancha Prison, Manzanares, Ciudad Real
- Huelva Prison, Huelva
- Ibiza Prison, Ibiza, Balearic Islands
- Jaén Prison, Jaén
- La Moraleja Prison, Dueñas, Palencia
- Lledoners Prison, Sant Joan de Vilatorrada, Barcelona
- Lleida Prison, Lleida
- Las Palmas Prison, Las Palmas de Gran Canaria
- Logroño Prison, Logroño, La Rioja
- Mansilla de las Mulas Prison, Mansilla de las Mulas, Léon
- Melilla Prison, Melilla
- Monterroso Prison, Monterroso, Lugo
- Morón de la Frontera Prison, Morón de la Frontera, Seville
- Murcia Prison, Murcia
- Nanclares de la Oca Prison, Langraiz-Oka, Álava
- Navalcarnero Prison, Navalcarnero, Community of Madrid
- Ocaña Prison, Ocaña, Toledo
- Palma Prison, Palma, Balearic Islands
- Pamplona Prison, Pamplona, Navarre
- Pereiro de Aguiar Prison, Pereiro de Aguiar, Ourense
- Puerto Prison, Puerto de Santa María, Cádiz
- Quatre Camins Prison, la Roca del Vallès, Barcelona
- San Sebastián Prison, San Sebastián, Gipuzkoa
- Santa Cruz de la Palma Prison, Santa Cruz de la Palma, Santa Cruz de Tenerife
- Santa Cruz de Tenerife Prison, El Rosario, Santa Cruz de Tenerife
- Segovia Prison, Segovia
- Seville Prison, Seville
- Soria Prison, Soria
- Soto del Real Prison, Soto del Real, Community of Madrid
- Tarragona Prison, Tarragona
- Teixeiro Prison, Curtis, A Coruña
- Teruel Prison, Teruel
- Topas Prison, Topas, Salamanca
- Valdemoro Prison, Valdemoro, Community of Madrid
- Valladolid Prison, Villanubla, Valladolid
- Villabona Prison, Llanera, Asturias
- Zuera Prison, Zuera, Zaragoza
- Wad-Ras Prison, Barcelona

==== Former prisons ====
- Carabanchel Prison, Madrid
- Cárcel Modelo, Madrid
- Cárcel Real of Cádiz, Cádiz
- Madrid Model Prison, Madrid
- Málaga Prison, Málaga
- Les Corts Prison, Barcelona
- Porlier Prison, Madrid
- Ranilla Prison, Seville
- Trinitat Prison, Barcelona

==== Prisons planned and under construction ====
- Tàrrega prison, Tàrrega, Lleida
- El Catllar prison, el Catllar, Tarragona
- Zona Franca prison, Barcelona

=== Sudan ===
- Kobar Prison

=== Sweden ===
- Långholmen prison, Stockholm (defunct, now operating as a hotel and museum)
- Kumla prison, Kumla
- Hall prison, Södertälje
- Norrtälje prison, Norrtälje

=== Syria ===
- Far'Falastin
- Hesekê Hasakah Central Prison
- Tadmor Prison
- Mezze Prison (closed)
- Chirkin prison, Qamishli
- Sednaya Prison

== T ==
=== Taiwan ===
- Taipei Prison

=== Timor-Leste ===
- Becora Prison
- Gleno Prison
- Suai Prison

=== Thailand ===
- Buddha Monthon Temporary Prison, Dhaveevatthana Palace (part of Klong Prem Central Prison)
- Bang Kwang Central Prison, Nonthaburi Province
- Khao Kho District Jail, Phetchabun Province
- Nong Khai Immigration Detention Center, Nong Khai Province

==== Remand prisons ====
Thailand has four remand prisons:

- Bangkok Remand Prison
- Minburi Remand Prison
- Pattaya Remand Prison (Chonburi Province)
- Thonburi Remand Prison

=== Turkey ===
- Diyarbakır Prison, Diyarbakır
- Hasdal Military Prison, Istanbul
- İmralı prison, Marmara Sea
- Metris prison, Istanbul
- Paşakapısı Prison, Üsküdar, Istanbul
- Silivri Prison, Istanbul
- Sinop Fortress Prison, Sinop (closed)
- Sultanahmet Jail, Istanbul (closed)
- Uşak Prison, Uşak

== U ==
=== United Arab Emirates ===
- Dubai Central Jail, Al Aweer, Dubai
  - Dubai Women's Central Jail
- Sharjah Reformatory and Punitive Establishment (SRPE)

== V ==
=== Vietnam ===
- Chí Hòa Prison
- Phú Quốc Prison

== Y ==
Yemen

- Beir Ahmed

== Others ==
- Abu Ghraib, Iraq
- Bangkwang, Nonthaburi Province, Thailand, nicknamed the "Big Tiger"
- Camp Boiro, Conakry, Guinea
- Camp Crame, Manila, Philippines
- Chikurubi, Zimbabwe
- Devil's Island, French Guiana
- Ezeiza Women's Prison, Buenos Aires, Argentina
- Hanoi Hilton, Hanoi, Vietnam (POW prison; historical)
- Insein Prison, Myanmar
- Palacio de Lecumberri, Mexico City, Mexico
- Penal del Altiplano, Almoloya de Juárez, Mexico
- Playa Negra (Black Beach), Equatorial Guinea
- Robben Island, South Africa
- Terrorism Confinement Center, El Salvador
