= Zhongdu (disambiguation) =

Zhongdu is the pinyin romanization of the Chinese characters 中都, meaning "Central Capital". It may refer to:

- Zhongdu, the capital of the Jurchen Jin Dynasty during the 12th century, located in present-day Beijing
- Zhongdu, the capital of the Mongol Yuan dynasty during the 14th century, ordered to be built by Külüg Khan (emperor Wuzong), located in Zhangbei County
- Zhongdu, a proposed capital for the new Ming Dynasty to be located at the birthplace of the Hongwu Emperor in Anhui

Zhongdu, written with other Chinese characters, is also used for other place names:

- Zhongdu, Luzhai County (中渡镇), a town in Luzhai County, Guangxi
- Zhongdu, Shanghang County, a town in Fujian
- Zhongdu, Xupu (中都乡), a township of Xupu County, Hunan
