= Prison 59 =

Prison 59 (in Persian: بازداشتگاه ۵۹) is an unofficial detention centre on Vali-e Asr Avenue in Tehran, Iran, under the administration of the Iranian Revolutionary Guard Corps. Like other covert detention centres such as Towhid Prison and Amaken, prisoners here are held without charge and subjected to solitary confinement.

== See also ==
- Evin Prison
  - Prison 209
- Heshmatiyeh Prison
- Gohardasht Prison
- Towhid Prison
