= List of prisons in Guangxi =

This is a list of prisons within Guangxi region of the People's Republic of China.

| Name | Enterprise name | City/County/District | Village/Town | Established | Notes |
|---|---|---|---|---|---|
| Bailong Prison | Guangxi Guigang City Shilong Comprehensive Field | Guigang | Shilong | | Formerly called Guangxi Yulin District Shipai Labor Reform Detachment |
| Baise Prison (Qinzhou Prison) | Baise Tea Plantation | Qinnan District, Qinzhou | Wucun | 1951 | Exports to Great Britain and the United States, formerly located in Yanwei (belonging to Baise, Guangxi), produces tea under brand name Phoenix |
| Beihai Prison | Guangxi Beihai Potter Factory; Beihai Factory | Beihai | Pingyang, Gaode | 1998 | Produces or used to produce a kiln for American SD Corporation |
| Guangxi Women's Prison | Guangxi Nanning Maoqiao Clothing Factory | Nanning | | 1990 | Present name since 1995, formerly known as Guangxi District Production Brigade of female Juvenile Delinquent |
| Guigang Prison | Construction Materials Plant | Gangbei District, Guigang | | | Produces Portland cement of the brands Jinwang and Shanbao |
| Guiping Prison | Shipai Farm | Liuzhou | | | |
| Guizhong Prison | Guizhong Prison Sugar refinery, Guizhong Prison Feed Factory | Luzhai County, Liuzhou | Luorong | 1951 | One of the largest prisons in Guangxi |
| Liucheng Prison | Guangxi Sitang Farm; Sitang Tea Farm | Liucheng County, Liuzhou | Mashan, Dapu | | |
| Luzhou Prison | Guangxi Shiliuhe Farm Garden | Luzhai County | | | |
| Nanning Prison | Nanning Machinery Plant; Nanning Yibin Motorcycle Co. Ltd.; Nanning Donghuan Craft Factory | Nanning | | 2003 | Main products are Gaofeng brand diesel engines and Jintian motorcycles. Nanning Machinery Plant and S. P. International from Thailand established Nanning Yibin Motorcycle Ltd. |
| Tonglin Prison | Longkou Tea Farm | Wuzhou | | | Formerly in Luzhai County, Liuzhou, moved to Wuzhou in 2008 |
| Wuzhou Prison | Wuzhou Works | | | | |
| Yingshan Prison | Yingshan Diesel Engine Factory; Guangxi Yingshan Foundry | | | 1967 | formerly in Zhongdu, Luzhai County, Liuzhou, moved to Guilin in 2001 |
| Zhongdu Prison | Guangxi Zhongdu Ironworks | | | 1951 | On November 30, 2004, more than 1,000 prisoners were transferred there |
| Zhongshan Prison | | Hezhou | Zhongshan County | | |

== Sources ==
- "Laogai Handbook 2007-2008" (PDF) (in Chinese and English). Washington, D.C.: Laogai Research Foundation. October 2008. pp. 119–128. ISBN 978-1-931550-25-3.
