= List of prisons in Guizhou =

This is a list of prisons within Guizhou province of the People's Republic of China.

| Name | Enterprise name | City/County/District | Village/Town | Established | Notes |
|---|---|---|---|---|---|
| Anshun Prison | Jiaozishan Coal Mine, Anshun Coal Mine | Xixiu District, Anshun | Dadongkou Jiaozishan | 1952 | |
| Beidoushan Prison | Weng'an Phosphorite First & Second Factory | Weng'an County | Liugongcun Yuhuaxian | 1965 | |
| Bijie Prison | Bijie Prison Vitriol Sulphur Factory | | | 1953 | |
| Chishui Prison | Huayi Paper Mill | Zunyi | Chishui City | 1958 | Sales US$4.676 mil. |
| Dadongla Prison | Lusi Rock Brick Tile Factory; Cement Plant; Jinjiang Constant Materials Factory | Tongren Prefecture | | | |
| Dafang Prison | Sulfur Manufacturing Plant; Qianxi Farm | Dafang County | Maochang | | |
| Danzhai Prison | Guizhou Prov. Danzhai Gold and Mercury Mine | Danzhai County | Jinzhongxiang, Longquan | 1952 | |
| Dongpo Prison | Dongpo Tea Farm | Huangping County | | 1953 | produces tea of the brand Feiyun, area of 24.1 km² |
| Duyun Prison | Jianjiang Cement Plant | | | 1958 | |
| Fuquan Prison | Fuquan Phosphate Fertilizer Plant; Fuquan China Factory | | | 1950 | Fertilizer brand Fuquan is exported to Japan, South Korea, South East Asia and Brazil |
| Guangshun Prison | Guangshun Farm | | Guangshun | | |
| Guiyang Prison | Guiyang China Factory | | | 1958 | Current name since 1976 |
| Guizhou Juvenile Offender Detachment | | Guiding County | Chengguan | 1983 | |
| Haizi Prison | Anlong Haizi Farm; Lotus Root Processing Factory | | | 2008 | Resulted from a merger of the prison of the same name with Xingyi, Qinglong and Pu'an prisons |
| Jinhua Prison | Jinhua Farm | | | | |
| Jinxi Prison | Jinxi Coal Mine | | | 1983 | Resulted from a 1983 merger |
| Kaili Prison | Guizhou Kaili Machine Tool Factory; Kaili Automobile Overhaul Plant; Brickyard | | | 1963 | Area of prison 8 km² |
| Ninggu Prison | Mine Car Factory | Anshun | Ninggu | | |
| Pingba Prison | Pingba Farm | Pingba County | | | |
| Pu'an Prison | Pu'an Lead Mine | Pu'an County | Guanziyao | | Has merged with other prisons in 2008 |
| Qinglong Prison | Guizhou Province Qinglong Antimony | Qinglong County | Dachang | | Has merged with other prisons in 2008 |
| Shazishao Prison | Guizhou Baiyun Nonferrous Metals Limited Company | Baiyun District, Guiyang | Shazishao | 2003 | Produces zinc of Jindun brand |
| Songlin Prison | | Zunyi | Jindingshan | | |
| Taiping Prison | Taiping Farm | Anshun | | | |
| Tian'gou Prison | Lujiawan Coal Mine; Zunyi Coal Mine | Zunyi | Donggong | 1951 | |
| Tongren Prison | Tongren Mercury Mine | Tongren Prefecture | Dajiangping | 1952 | |
| Wangwu Prison | Wangwu Farm | Guiyang | | | Established in the 1950s, high-security prison with more than 4,000 inmates |
| Weng'an Prison | Weng'an Coal Mine | Weng'an County | Baishuihe | 1958 | |
| Xingyi Prison | Paper Mill | Xingyi, Guizhou | | | 31.95% were from ethnic minorities, merged with Qinglong, Pu'an and Haizi Prisons in 2008, had high security |
| Yang'ai Prison | Yang'ai Tea Farm | Huaxi District, Guiyang | | 1952 | Is the only women's prison in the province, tea farm was established in 1952. Produces tea, exports to Japan, Europe, United States, producesyogurt of Yang'ai brand |
| Yudong Prison | Yudong Coal Mine | Kaili | Longchang | 1959 | |
| Zhongzhuang Prison | Phosphate Fertilizer Plant | Zunyi | Honghuagang | 1958 | |
| Zunyi Prison | Zunyi Coal Mine | Zunyi | Lijiawan, Niqiao | 1952 | |

== Sources ==
- "Laogai Handbook 2007-2008" (PDF) (in Chinese and English). Washington, D.C.: Laogai Research Foundation. October 2008. pp. 129–144. ISBN 978-1-931550-25-3.
