= List of prisons in Fujian =

This is a list of prisons within Fujian province of the People's Republic of China.

| Name | Enterprise name | City/County/District | Village/Town | Established | Notes |
|---|---|---|---|---|---|
| Anxi Prison | Anxi Coal Mine | Anxi County | | | includes unconfirmed information |
| Cangshan Prison | | Fuzhou | Luozhou Town, Cangshan District | | |
| Changle Prison | | Changle | Yingqian | | includes unconfirmed information |
| Dehua Prison | Dehua Xinjian Porcelain Factory | Dehua County | | | includes unconfirmed information |
| Fu'an Prison | Baidu Farm | Fu'an | Baidu | | includes unconfirmed information |
| Fuqing Prison | Fuqing Farm | Fuqing | Xiashi, Jingyang | | |
| Fuzhou Prison | Min'an Printing Factory; Fuzhou Minxing Magnetic Materials Plant; Fujian Prov. Keda Health Products Factory | Fuzhou | | | |
| Jian'ou Prison | Yangze Coal Mine | Jian'ou | | | includes unconfirmed information |
| Jianyang Prison | Liangbu Farm Jianyang Valve Plant; Jianyang Xingfa Bambooware Plant; Jianyang Chemical and Machinery Plant; Jianyang Xiaohu Farm | Jianyang | Tongyou | | Houses thousands of criminals. In 2005 a special AIDS squadron was established |
| Jinjiang Prison | Quanzhou Farm | Jinjiang City | Honglai | | includes unconfirmed information |
| Lianjiang Prison | Wangfeng Farm | Lianjiang County | | | includes unconfirmed information |
| Longxi Prison | Mashan Farm | Longhai, Fujian | Chengxixu | | includes unconfirmed information |
| Longyan Prison | Longyan Plastics and Mechanic Factory; Longyan Qingcaomeng Cement Plant | Longyan | Xinluo District | | Current name since 1994 |
| Mingxi Prison | Louqian Farm | Mingxi County | Louqian | | includes unconfirmed information |
| Minhou Prison | Fujian Rongxin Mold and Plastics Factory; Fujian Rongxin Machine Tool Plant; Fujian Rongxin Building Materials Factory; Fujian Rongxin Casting Branch Factory | Cangshan District, Fuzhou | Luozhou | 1985 | Is in Aoshan Industrial Zone; Sales of US$1.274 mil. |
| Minjiang Prison | | Minhou County, Fuzhou | Tongnan, Nanxu town | | New location with an area of 166548.69 m^{2} |
| Minqing Prison | | Minqing County | Houshan | | includes unconfirmed information |
| Minxi Prison | Longyan Qingcaomeng Flour Mill; Plastics Machinery Plant; Handicraft Factory; Commodity Plant; Machine-Made Bricks Factory Brickyard; No. 3 Machine-Made Bricks Factory; Longyan Qingcaomeng Farm | Longyan | | 1955 | Largest prison in province, 30-40 thousand inmates |
| Nan'an Prison | | Nan'an, Fujian | Zhuocu | | includes unconfirmed information |
| Ningde Prison | | Ningde | Jinhan, Jiaocheng District | | Expected to be finished in 2009 |
| Ninghua Prison | Liangsangang Farm | Ninghua County | Liangsangang, Hucun | | Closed in 2005 |
| Provincial Juvenile Offender Detachment | Minhou Xinguang Licensing System Factory; Raw Materials Processing Branch Factory | | | | |
| Provincial No. 1 Juvenile Offender Detachment | | Longyan | | | includes unconfirmed information |
| Provincial No. 2 Juvenile Offender Detachment | | | | | includes unconfirmed information |
| Provincial Women's Prison | Fuzhou Lianhua Clothing Processing Factory; Fuzhou Lianhua Handicrafts Processing Factory | | | | Only women's prison in province |
| Pucheng Prison | Yongping Farm | Pucheng County, Fujian | Yongping | | includes unconfirmed information |
| Putian Prison | | Putian | Hanjiang District, Putian | | In 2003 staff and inmates were at a combined total of about 4,000 |
| Qingliu Prison | Qingliu Xinken Farm; Qingliu Jianxin Construction Company; Minxin Livestock Farm; Qingliu Prison Integrated Team Soy Sauce Factory | | | 1965 | Registered capital of 5 mil yuan, soy sauce factory in Linshe, Qingliu County, Sanming |
| Quanzhou Prison | Quanzhou Shenghua Knit Clothing; Quanzhou Jisanjiao Plastics Plant; Quanzhou Machine-Made Bricks Factory; Quanzhou Shenghua Plastic Mold Plant | Fengze District, Quanzhou | Dongyueshan | | |
| Rongcheng Prison | Prov. Jianxin Construction Co.; Xin'an Reflective Signs Factory; Jianxin Automobile Repair Plant; Minhou Nangang Plastics Plant | Fuzhou | | 1953 | In 2003, it housed more than 3,700 prisoners |
| Taining Prison | Gekou Farm | Taining County | | | includes four Labor Reform Departments and unconfirmed information |
| Tong'an Prison | Zhuba Farm | Tong'an District | Sanzhuba | | includes unconfirmed information |
| Wuyishan Prison | Huangtu Farm; Wuyishan Farm; Wuyishan Tianyou Tea Factory | | | | |
| Xiamen Prison | Jiangtou Salt Mine | Tong'an District, Xiamen | | 1998 | Area of 50,000 m^{2} and about 3,300 inmates |
| Yong'an Prison | Dazhouhu Brickyard; Yong'an Building Materials Factory; Yong'an Feiqiao Cement Factory | Yong'an | | | |
| Zhangzhou Prison | | Xiangcheng District, Zhangzhou | | | |
| Zhenghe Prison | Dongping Farm Tea Factory | Zhenghe County | Dongping | | includes unconfirmed information |

== Sources ==
- "Laogai Handbook 2007-2008" (PDF) (in Chinese and English). Washington, D.C.: Laogai Research Foundation. October 2008. pp. 65–80. ISBN 978-1-931550-25-3.
