= List of prisons in Hainan =

Name	Enterprise name	City/County/District	Village/Town	Established	Notes
Ding'an Prison		Ding'an County			
Haikou Prison		Haikou	East of Haiyuzhongxian, Xiuying District	1950	Oldest prison in province, prison with the largest police force, formerly called Renxing Prison. In 2005 there numerous sentences were reduced.
Ledong Prison		Ledong Li Autonomous County	Jiusuo	1984	Output value was 3 million yuan in 2003.
Meilan Prison	Rubber Plant; Jingguan Industries Limited; Changming Fish Powder Processing Plant	Haikou	Sanjiang		2005 output value was 15.79 million yuan. 2006 prisoner population of 3096
Provincial Juvenile Offender Detachment Fengxiang Prison				2004	Result from a merger of Provincial Women's Prison and Provincial Juvenile Offenders' Department, houses hundreds of prisoners (143 minors)
Qiongshan Prison	Daomei Farm; Hainan Soap Factory	Qiongshan, Haikou	Fucheng	1951	Originally called Dongshan Labour Reform Detachment, also known as Sanjiang Prison
Sanya Prison		Sanya	Tiandu	1995	Is a high alert prison

== Sources ==
- "Laogai Handbook 2007-2008" (PDF) (in Chinese and English). Washington, D.C.: Laogai Research Foundation. October 2008. pp. 145–148. ISBN 978-1-931550-25-3.
