= List of prisons in Henan =

This is a list of prisons within Henan province of the People's Republic of China.

Name	Enterprise name	City/County/District	Village/Town	Established	Notes
Gongyi Prison	Gongxian Construction Materials Works	Zhongmu County			Formerly in Jiajinkou, Gongyi. Can hold up to 3,000 inmates
Huangchuan Prison	Huanghu Farm	Huangchuan County			
Jiaonan Prison	Xinhe Farm	Jiefang District, Jiaozuo			
Jiaozuo Prison	Jiaozuo Bone Glue Factory	Jiaozuo	Laoniuhe, Shangbaizuo		Holds about 1,000 prisoners, produces or used to produces glue of Twin Arrow brand
Kaifeng City Prison	Kaifeng Hongda Books and Periodicals Printing and Binding Factory	Kaifeng	Chenfen		
Luoyang Prison		Luoyang			
Mianchi Prison	Mianchi Farm	Mianchi County			Includes Xinsheng Brickyard
Nanyang Prison	Xindian Farm	Nanyang, Henan			
Neihuang Prison		Neihuang County		1952	Yearly average of 2,700 inmates
Pingdingshan Prison	Pingdingshan City Xinsheng Coal Mine; Flour Mine; Aquatics Breeding Factory	Pingdingshan			
Pingyuan Prison	Xinxiang Fire Control Machinery Plant	Xinxiang			Large-scale prison
Provincial Juvenile Offender Detachment		Jiaozuo			
Provincial No. 1 Prison	Carton Factory	Kaifeng			High-security prison, detained about 3,000 persons in March 2005, 60% serving death sentences with reprieve or life sentences
Provincial No. 2 Juvenile Offender Detachment		Zhengzhou	Miaoli		
Provincial No. 3 Prison	Hongxing Electromagnetic Plant, Labor Services Co. Woven Bamboo Products Plant, Qingnian Integrated Plant, Clothing Factory	Yuzhou City		1951	Holds offenders serving 10 years and more
Provincial No. 4 Prison	Luoyang Bearing and Forging Works, Luoyang City Changshun Bearings Ltd., Luoyang City Songtian Glass and Steel Assembly	Luoyang			
Provincial Women's Prison	Xinxiang General Clothing Factory	Xinxiang			
Puyang Prison		Puyang County			Inmates serve short sentences
Sanmenxia Prison	Heiyangshan Cement Plant	Sanmenxia			About 2,000 inmates
Shangcai Prison	Taqiao Farm				
Shangqiu Prison		Shangqiu		1952	2,000 inmates (3,300 in 1994)
Xihua Prison	Wu'er 5-2 Farm	Xihua County		1962	Area of 46 km²
Xinxiang Prison	Xinxiang City Zhongke Mining Equipment Ltd.; Xinxiang Ceramics Works; Xinxiang Internal Combustion Engine Works	Xinxiang		1985	Yellow River diesel engines are exported to South Africa and South East Asia, inter alia
Xinyang Prison	Wuyi Farm	Luoshan County Xinyang			
Xinzheng Prison	Xinzheng Prison Clothing Processing Plant, Xingshan Stone Material Factory	Xinzheng			Is in Xingshan, at least partially in Louli
Xuchang Prison	Xuchang Engineering Labor Reform Company	Xuchang	Yulin	1986	Held 2,000 inmates in about 2008
Yubei Prison	Xinxiang Construction Materials Plant			1954	From opening until 2005, housed more than 100,000 inmates
Yudong Prison	Zhenhua Glass Works	Shangqiu			More than 2,000 inmates
Yuxi Prison		Luoyang		1980	
Zhengyang Prison	Wusan (5-3) Farm	Zhengyang County		1953	Holds 50,000 inmates, Ruitu glossy paper is produced there
Zhengzhou Juvenile Offender Detachment		Zhengzhou			
Zhengzhou Prison	Qiligang Cement Plant, Lianxiang Printing Factory	Xinmi and Zhongyuan District, Zhengzhou			
Zhengzhou Women's Prison		Zhongmu County	Liuji		Houses 3,000 inmates
Zhoukou Prison	Chemical Coating Factory, Baolian Chemical Industry Ltd., Fushou Health Care Foods Factory, Cotton Processing Factory, Sulphuric Acid plant	Xihua County, Zhoukou			About 5,000 inmates
Zhumadian Prison	Wusan Farm	Zhumadian and Xinyang		1980	1,000 inmates

== Sources ==
- "Laogai Handbook 2007-2008" (PDF) (in Chinese and English). Washington, D.C.: Laogai Research Foundation. October 2008. pp. 183–206. ISBN 978-1-931550-25-3.
