= Remand Prison of Monaco =

Prison in Monaco

Coordinates: 43.7318°N 7.4271°E

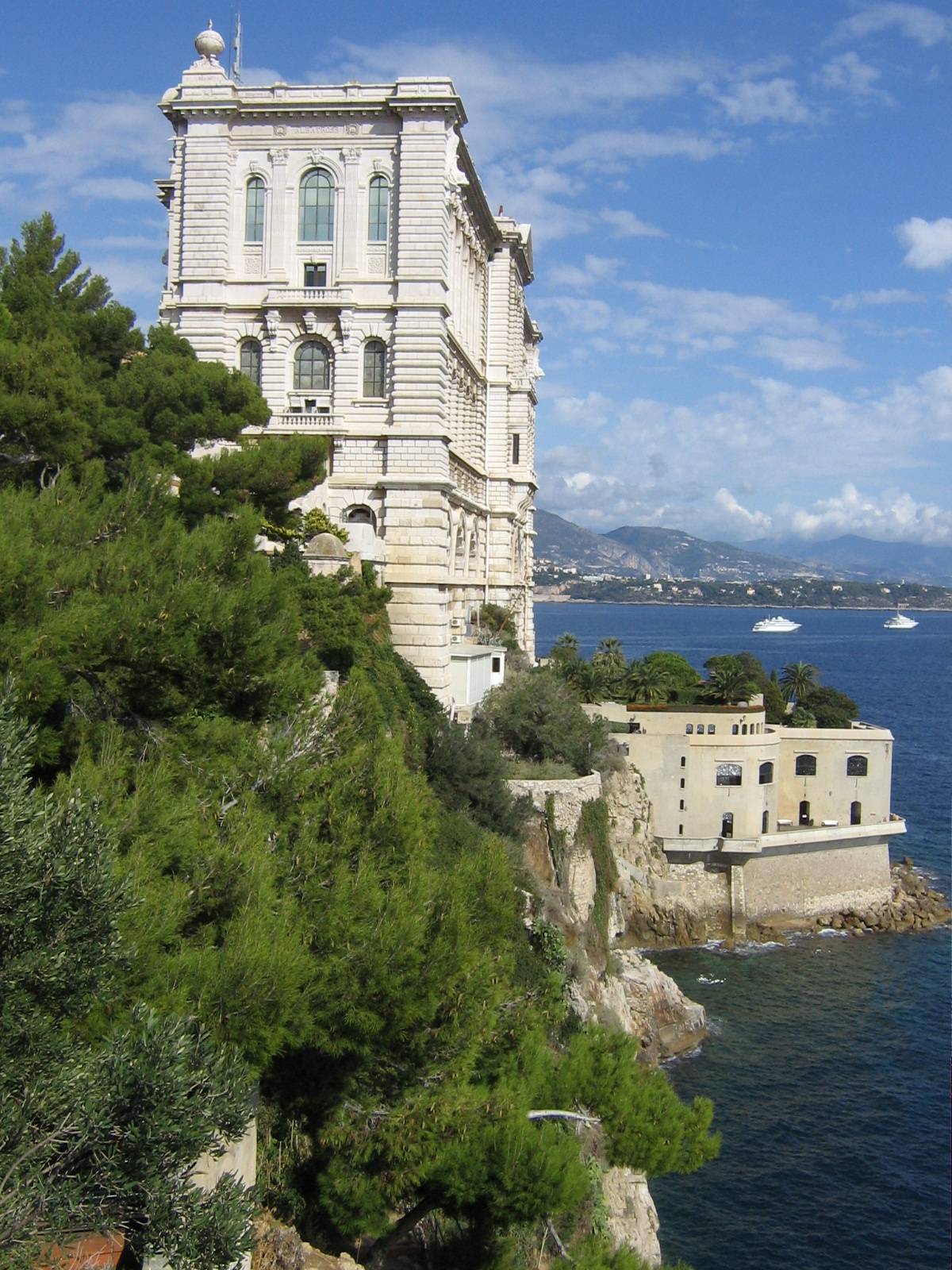
The prison is the building located to the right of the large Oceanographic Museum building and above the smaller buildings closest to the Mediterranean Sea.

The Remand Prison, or Maison d'Arrêt is a prison in the Principality of Monaco located on 4 Avenue Saint-Martin, 98000 Monaco. The prison includes four cellblocks, a chapel, and a prison yard. The Remand Prison is known for its sea view and is sometimes referred to a 5-star prison, however according to the elected representatives of the National Council, who visited the Remand prison, it is a misstatement. The Director of the Remand Prison is Jean-Yves Gambarini.

== History ==
The Remand Prison was founded in the end of the nineteenth century when economic growth of the Principality attracted foreign profit-seekers that comprised a significant part of the imprisoned. In the beginning of the twentieth century, the number of prison population dropped significantly as Europe mobilized for World War I.

In 1986 the Government of the Principality carried out the building renovation to expand the Remand Prison to three cellblocks. In 2000 a new construction project was approved to create an administrative area on three floors of the prison, ensuring that the building was fully integrated within the protected area of Monaco-Ville.

In 2015 prison population rate in Monaco was considerably low and comprised 74.1 inmates per 100,000 inhabitants. However prison population is “artificially reduced” as many prisoners serve their sentences in France.
