= Acheron Boys Home =

Criminal housing facility in Victoria, Australia

- Interactive map of Acheron Boys Home
- Location: Buxton, Victoria; 37.509726°S 145.545502°E
- Status: Closed
- Security class: Minimum
- Capacity: 10
- Opened: circa 1966
- Closed: 2008
- Managed by: Youth Justice Custodial Services

Acheron Youth Camp, a closed Australian minimum security training facility for juvenile males, was located in Buxton, Victoria, Australia, approximately 100 kilometres (62 mi) north–east of Melbourne.

The facility was operated by Youth Justice Custodial Services, an agency of the Department of Justice of the Victorian Government, and closed in 2008.

Set on 350 acres (140 ha), the camp was an alternative custodial option for up to ten young men aged 15–17 on Youth Justice Centre Orders. Administered by the Melbourne Youth Justice Centre, the camp focused on vocational development, rehabilitation and community integration.

== Programs and facilities ==
Young people at Acheron participate in a broad range of work-based activities that are integrated with accredited general education programs and training in building and construction and horticulture (landscape) provided by the Kangan Institute of TAFE. Work activities include building construction, preventative maintenance, clearing, mowing, painting, tree felling, cutting wood and weed spraying. Young people are encouraged to participate in a range of recreational activities, including fishing, bushwalking, horse riding and playing golf.

Young people can be granted weekend leave to their families, depending on their circumstances and their progress in the program.

Health professionals from the Melbourne Youth Justice Centre provide counselling and other personal development programs on an outreach basis.
