= Søbysøgård State Prison =

Open prison in Denmark

Coordinates: 55°17′27″N 10°22′05″E

- Interactive map of Søbysøgård State Prison
- Location: Nr. Søby, Central Denmark Region, Denmark.
- Status: Operational
- Security class: open prison
- Capacity: 176
- Managed by: The Danish Prison and Probation Service
- Warden: Lars Skjødt Vinther

The State Prison at Søbysøgård is an open prison in Denmark, which is arranged at the Hall of Søby Søgård close to Årslev.

The manor house was being used as a youth prison in 1933 but has been changed to an open prison in 1973. In 2003 The State Prison at Søbysøgård also got a half open section at the prison. The prison has a space for 134 inmates, of whom 26 are in the semi-open section.

Prison places great emphasis on education of the inmates – It is possible to take preparatory adult education and adult education in the prison.

== External reference ==
- The State Prison at Søbysøgård - The Danish Prison and Probation Service website
