= Opera Prison =

Prison in Milan, Italy

Coordinates: 45.3958°N 9.2049°E

- Interactive map of Opera Prison
- Location: Via Camporgnago 40, Milan, Italy
- Status: Operational
- Security class: Casa di reclusione
- Capacity: 918
- Population: 1,358 (23 October 2026)
- Opened: 1987
- Managed by: Ministry of Justice

Opera Prison (officially Casa di reclusione di Milano-Opera) is a prison in Milan, Lombardy, Italy. It opened in 1987 and mainly holds prisoners with final sentences who have more than five years left to serve. In October 2026 it held 1,358 inmates against 918 official places.

Its unit for prisoners under the 41-bis regime is the second largest in Italy after the one in L'Aquila.

== History ==
The prison opened in 1987. A bunker courtroom for large trials was designed next to the prison in 1996, and construction began in 1999. In 2015 Il Giornale reported that more than €11 million had been spent on the building, which was still unfinished. A planned access road could not be built because the surrounding land had never been expropriated, so the courtroom would only be reachable by passing through the prison. The Court of Audit had opened an inquiry into the loss of public money.

In July 2021, 25 years after the project began, the courtroom was still unfinished. At least €12 million had been made available for it, and a further €1.5 million had been allocated.

== Facilities ==
The cells were designed for one person each and now hold up to two. The prison has 818 cells, 14 workshops, 23 classrooms, a theatre and two sports fields.

A new wing with 400 more places is under construction. In 2024 Il Giornale reported that the building site had been stopped by red tape.

== Population and staff ==
On 23 October 2026 the prison held 1,358 inmates. Its official capacity was 918 places, 12 of which were unavailable. In March 2025 Il Giorno reported that it held 1,308 inmates.

At the end of September 2026 the prison had 532 officers of the Penitentiary Police out of 628 planned. The Ministry of Justice also lists 16 educators out of 22 planned.

== High security and 41-bis unit ==
The prison holds prisoners linked to organised crime.

Opera has the second largest 41-bis unit in Italy. On 31 October 2022 it held 95 of the 728 prisoners under the regime nationwide, behind L'Aquila. On 9 November 2025 it held 99, while L'Aquila held 148 out of a national total of 726.

== Healthcare ==
The prison has a medical unit for intensified care, known by the Italian acronym SAI, linked to the San Paolo hospital. In August 2024 la Repubblica reported that the prison had only one doctor for 1,385 inmates.

== Work and education ==
In 2024 Il Giornale reported that 500 of the 1,300 inmates worked, most as cleaners. One workshop assembled decoders for Sky. Cables, about 500,000 pieces a year, are also produced at the prison. A partnership started in 2023 led to a construction school inside the prison. By May 2026 about 80 inmates had attended it and 37 had been hired.

In 2024, 107 inmates were enrolled in university courses, 40 of them in the 41-bis unit.

== Cultural and religious projects ==
Since 2008 the reading and writing workshop Leggere libera-mente has run in the prison. It started as a weekly workshop with three hours of reading and grew to 22 hours, with more than 400 participants over the years. Its newspaper, In corso d'Opera, received the Ambrogino d'oro, the highest civic award of the city of Milan.

By 2015 the Fondazione Casa dello Spirito e delle Arti had opened a workshop where inmates bake communion hosts for parishes and monasteries. On 9 April 2016 three inmates who worked there met Pope Francis at the end of a general audience and brought him 12,000 hosts. The same foundation set up a workshop where inmates make string instruments from the wood of migrant boats landed at Lampedusa. The first violin was played in the presence of Pope Francis on 4 February 2022. In February 2024 a concert with instruments built at Opera was announced at La Scala for 12 February, with cellists Mario Brunello and Giovanni Sollima. In January 2026 Riccardo Muti conducted the Luigi Cherubini Youth Orchestra inside the prison, playing instruments made from the boats.
