= Konnunsuo =

- Village
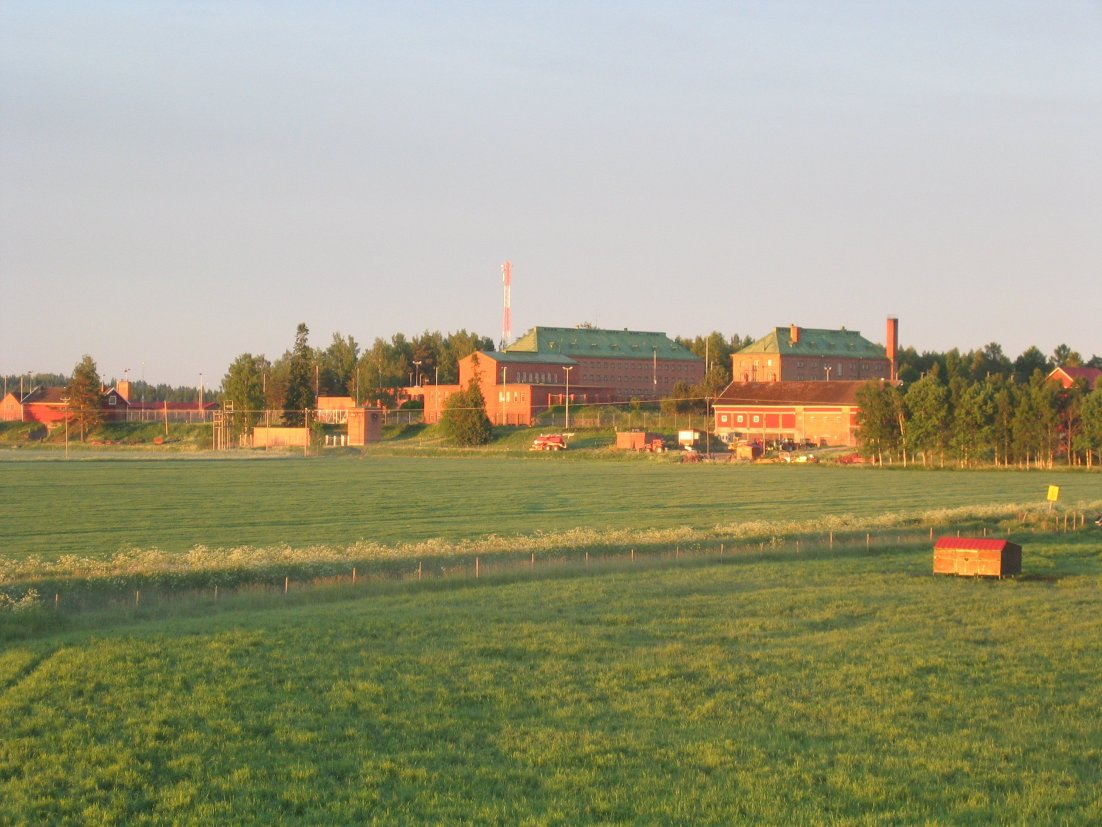
- The Konnunsuo Prison in the village.

- Location in Finland
- Coordinates: 61°01′48.0″N 28°32′23.6″E
- Country: Finland
- Region: South Karelia
- Municipality: Lappeenranta
- Subdivision: Joutseno

Population (2020-12-31)
  - Total: 73
- Time zone: UTC+2 (EET)
  - Summer (DST): UTC+3 (EEST)
- Postal code: 54190

Konnunsuo (Finnish pronunciation: [ˈkonːunˌsuo̯]) is a small village of the former municipality of Joutseno, today part of the Lappeenranta in South Karelia, Finland. It is located about 15 kilometres (9.3 mi) from the Russian border. In 2020, only 73 people lived in the village postal code area. The landscape of the central part of the village is dominated by the former Konnunsuo Prison, which was turned into an agricultural prison in the early 20th century. Officially, prison operations in Konnunsuo ended in May 2011.

In the summers of 2009–2017, a music-focused, interdisciplinary Kontufolk festival was organized in Konnunsuo.
