= Suai Prison =

Prison in East Timor

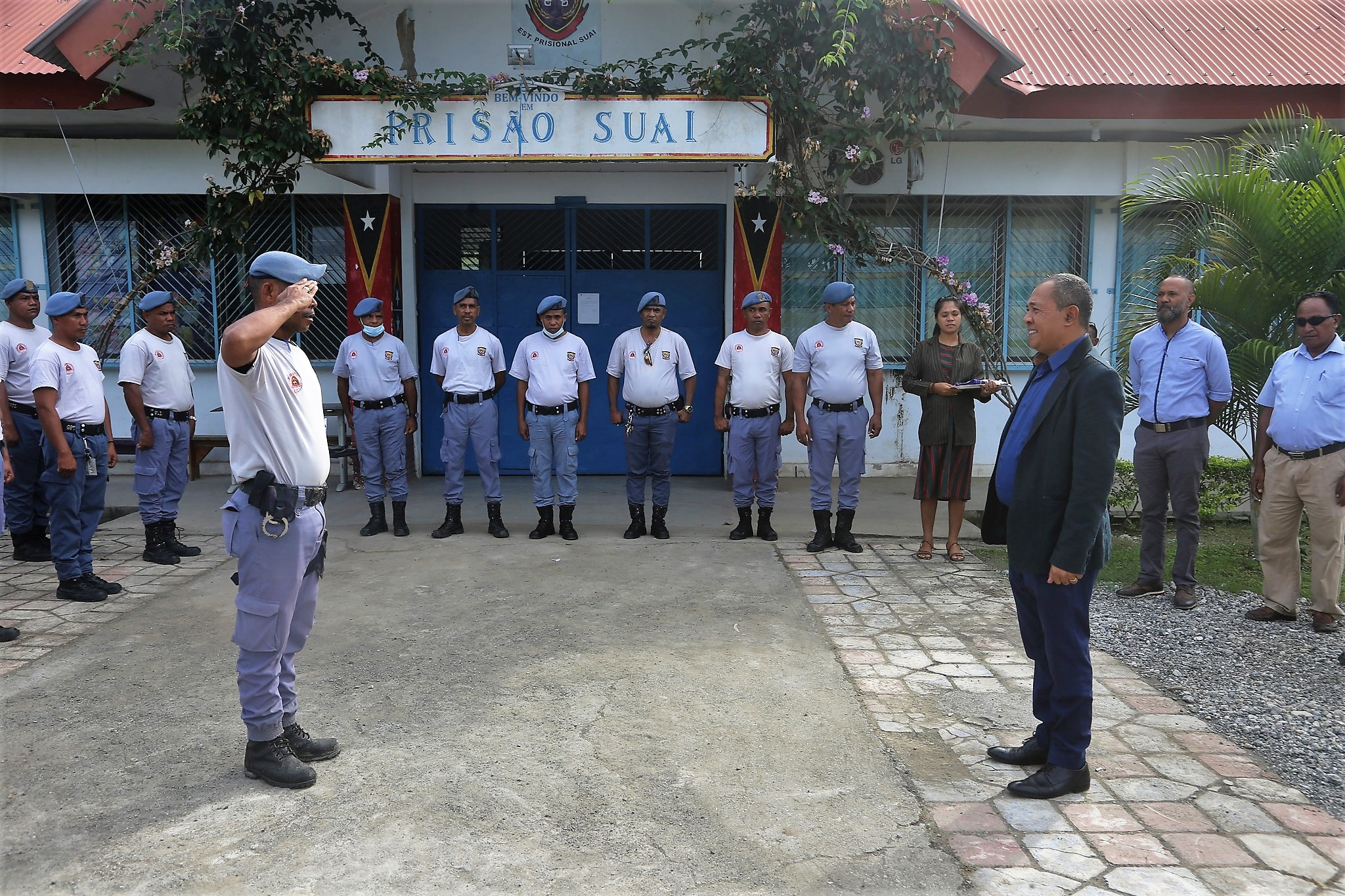
- Justice Minister Tiago Amaral Sarmento visits Suai Prison
- Interactive map of Suai Prison
- Location: East Timor; 8.8742°S 125.7275°E
- Population: 110 (2022)
- Opened: 2017
- Website: https://www.mj.gov.tl/?q=node/595

Suai Prison (Portuguese: Prisão de Suai; Tetum: Prizaun Suai) is a prison located in East Timor. In 2022, 110 criminals were held in the prison, of which 85 were in preventive detention.

== History ==
Construction of the prison began in 2014 and was completed in 2016. It was inaugurated in May 2017. In July 2022, the prison's inmates had to be evacuated due to flooding.
