= List of prisons in Ningxia =

This is a list of prisons within the Ningxia region of the People's Republic of China.

== Shizuishan ==
=== Detention Center ===
Name	Name	City/county/district	Village/town	Established	Notes
Shizuishan Detention Center		Dawukou District, Shizuishan 39° 3'15.51"N 106°27'31.53"E			Constructed in 2018, the Shizuishan detention center began renovations and expansion in August 2024.
Shizuishan No. 2 Detention Center		Dawukou District, Shizuishan 39° 0'30.55"N 106°25'59.10"E			
Pingluo Detention Center		Pingluo County, Shizuishan 38°57'38.97"N 106°28'14.46"E			

=== Prison ===
Name	Name	City/county/district	Village/town	Established	Notes
Shizuishan Prison	Huinong Farm; Cast Steel Workshop; Xinsheng Machine Tool Factory; Mingshuihu Farm (includes silicon carbide factory); Ningxia Ningsu Group Xitaida Agricultural and Trade Corp.	Dawukou District, Shizuishan 39° 1'19.85"N 106°25'51.94"E			4,000 inmates, three central detention centers (Huinong Sub-Prison, Pingluo Sub-Prison, Taixi Sub-Prison)

== Yinchuan ==
=== Prison ===
Name	Enterprise name	City/County/District	Village/Town	Established	Notes
Yinchuan Prison	Ningxia Yinchuan Pneumatic Machine Works	Yinchuan			Held 1,158 inmates in April 2004
Autonomuous Region Women's Prison	Xinhai'an Garment Group	Yinchuan		2001	600 inmates

== Other ==
Name	Enterprise name	City/County/District	Village/Town	Established	Notes
Guyuan Prison	Heicheng Farm	Guyuan City	Heicheng		
Wuzhong Prison	Guanmahu Farm; Ningxia Ningshuo Group Guanmahu Agricultural and Industrial Trade LLC; Ningxia Guanmahu Construction Corp.	Wuzhong City			
