= Jashore Central Jail =

Major prison in Jessore, Bangladesh

- Interactive map of Jashore Central Jail
- Location: Jail Road, Jessore, Jessore District, Khulna Division; 23.1718°N 89.2162°E
- Status: Open
- Security class: Maximum
- Capacity: 1919
- Population: 2500
- Opened: 1864; 162 years ago
- Former name: Jessore Central Jail
- Managed by: Bangladesh Jail
- Director: Mohammad Abdur Rahim
- Website: prison.jessore.gov.bd

Jashore Central Jail is a high security jail located at Jessore in southwestern Bangladesh. The jail previously known as Jessore Central Jail until 2018. It is used to sentence the longest-serving and most severely sentenced convicts of Khulna Division.

== History ==
Jessore Central Jail was formally established in 1864. While Jessore was designated as the first district of Bengal in 1781, it took several decades for the formal institutional prison system to be built. The 1864 date marks its official opening as a district jail during the British Raj, part of a wider push to standardize the penal system across the Indian subcontinent. It was later upgraded to the status of a Central Jail due to its strategic location and its role in housing high-profile prisoners from across the Khulna Division.

== Infrastructure and capacity ==
Jashore Central Jail has a capacity of 1919 prisoners. It is built on 40.71 acres of land, but the area inside the perimeter is 12.29 acres and outside is 28.42 acres. The prison has separate buildings for prisoners and guards. It also has Bangabandhu Corner, a library, Forkania Madrasa and a primary school.

== See also ==
- Dhaka Central Jail
- Chattogram Central Jail
- Bangladesh Jail
