= List of prisons in Heilongjiang =

This is a list of prisons within Heilongjiang province of the People's Republic of China.

Name	Enterprise name	City/County/District	Village/Town	Established	Notes
Bei'an Prison		Bei'an		1953	
Bijiashan Prison	Heilongjiang Tianying Group Bijiashan Farm; Bijiashan Datang Papermaking Ltd.	Jixian County, Shuangyashan		1953	In Bijiashan
Daqing Prison	Daqing City Shengtai Industrial Corp.	Daqing	Hongweixing	1984	Held 2,500 inmates in 2004, subsidiary enterprises of Daqing City Shengtai Industrial Corp. include: Jinyuan Machinery Plant, Shengtai Steel Rolling Mill, Pengfei Paper Products Plant, Chuncheng Auto Internal Parts factory. Closed for rebuilding between 2020 and 2025 and reopened in January 2026.
Dongfeng Prison	Dongfeng Prison South Sand Field	Daowai District, Harbin		1983	Holds 1,000 inmates
Fenghuangshan Prison	Fenghuangshan Farm	Dedu		1955	
Fula'erji Prison		Fularji District, Qiqihar			Merged to Qiqihar Prison in 2003
Hadagang Prison		Jidong County, Jixi			Merged to Jixi Prison in 2003
Harbin Prison		Xiangfang District, Harbin			More than 1,500 prisoners in 2003, rarely paroles inmates: 7 in 1996 5 in 1997 1 in 1998.
Hegang Prison	Qingshishan Stone Quarry	Hegang			In Qingshishan
Huashan Prison	Huashan Farm	Harbin City		1955	Originally Sujiadian Laogai Farm and Huashan Labor Reform Detachment, had 2000 inmates in 2003
Hulan Prison	Gezhi Construction Materials Plant, Gezhi Construction Materials Plant Plastic Knitting No. 2 Plant, Cement Plant	Hulan District			Held 3,000 inmates in 2004
Jiamusi Prison	Jiamusi Farm	Jiamusi	Xigemu	2003	Resulted from the merger of Jiamusi City Prison and Prov. Lianjiangkou Prison
Jixi Prison	Ping’an Coal Mine; Xinsheng No.2 Wells; Yuxin Coal Mine	Jixi	Xijiao	2003	Holds about 4,000 inmates, resulProv. Hadagang Prison merged to form Jixi Prison
Laolai Prison	Tianying Group Ltd. Laolai Farm	Nehe		Farm founded in Jun. 1955	The farm was originally controlled by prison administrative bureau, primarily engaged in agriculture. Cultivated area 10,770 ha. Grows soybeans. Farm has 9 basic units. Throughout the past 50 has undergone reorganization 5 times and had several name changes. From 1955 to 1968 managed by provincial PSB. 1983put under management of Prov. Judicial Andministration Prison Management Bureau. Jan. 1995 given current name. . 2004 in accordance with the Ministry of Justice Business Separation Act, farm was controlled by Heilongjiang Province Tianying Group Ltd.||
Lianjiangkou Prison	Lianjiangkou Farm	Jiamusi		1956	In Lianjiangkou, merged to Jiamusi Prison in 2003, includes Qingrong Rice Mill
Liming Prison		Xiangfang District, Harbin	Hongxing, Liming		7 people were paroled in 1996, 28 in 1997, 13 in 1998. The population of the prison exceeded 1500 in 1998
Liusan Prison	Grain and Rice Processing Factory; Liusan Farm Ltd.	Tailai County, Qiqihar			Has a labor force of 2,000 people
Mudanjiang Prison	Mudanjiang Prison Clothing Processing Factory; Prov. High-voltage Switch Factory	Mudanjiang	Xinglong	2001	resulted from a 2001 merger
Provincial Juvenile Offender Detachment	Printing Workshop	Harbin			In 2003 took in 518 new juvenile inmates. Percentage of inmates serving sentences of 6 years or more increased from 48.8% in 2000 to 50% in 2003. July 23, 2003 housed 1,000 juvenile inmates. Jul. 2004 held 1,273 inmates (603 are juveniles, 670 have reached adult age in prison).
Prov. Women's Prison	Landun Clothing Factory	Nangang District, Harbin			
Qiqihar Prison		Fuyu County, Qiqihar	Taha	2003	Resulted from a 2003 merger
Qitaihe Prison	Ceramic and Brick Plant; Xinsheng Coal Washery; Qitaihe City Prison Moulded Coal Plant	Qitaihe		2001	Resulted from a 2001 merger, in Zhongxinhe (including Longhu), in Sixin (belonging to Tieshan) (Qiezihe District and Taoshan District)
Songbin Prison	Songbin Toothpick Factory	Acheng District, Harbin	Yongyuan		
Tailai Prison		Tailai County, Qiqihar		1969	4300 inmates in 2003
Wudalianchi Prison		Wudalianchi			Formerly Yongfeng Prison
Wutonghe Prison	Wutonghe Farm	Hegang		1950	400 km^{2}
Xianglan Prison	Xianglan Farm	Tangyuan County, Jiamusi			
Xinjian Prison	Xinjian Construction Co.	Harbin City			an enterprise prison went bankrupt in 2006
Xinzhao Prison	Harbin Xinsheng Switch Plant	Harbin		1954	Merged to Mudanjiang Prison in
Yuquan Prison	Xinya Winged Pipe Energy Conservation Radiator Equipment Plant				Former Yuquan Prison and Songhuajiang Prison merged to form the new Yuquan Prison

== Sources ==
- "Laogai Handbook 2007-2008" (PDF) (in Chinese and English). Washington, D.C.: Laogai Research Foundation. October 2008. pp. 161–182. ISBN 978-1-931550-25-3.
