= Heshmatiyeh Prison =

Prison in Tehran, Iran

Coordinates: 35.73482°N 51.45690°E

Heshmatiyeh Prison (Persian: زندان حشمتیه, romanized: Zendān-e Heshmatiyeh) is a prison in Iran, located on a Revolutionary Guards (IRGC) base, in the North-East of Tehran. It is noted for its political prisoners' wing.

In 2011 it was suggested that Iranian opposition leaders Mir Hossein Mousavi, Mehdi Karroubi and their wives Zahra Rahnavard and Fatemeh Karroubi were being detained in the prison after abduction by security forces.
