= Hobart Reception Centre =

Prison in Tasmania, Australia

- Interactive map of Hobart Reception Centre
- Location: Hobart, Tasmania; 42.87905°S 147.3295°E
- Status: Operational
- Security class: Maximum (male and female)
- Capacity: 50
- Opened: January 1999
- Former name: Hobart Remand Centre
- Managed by: Tasmanian Prison Service

The Hobart Reception Centre, formerly the Hobart Remand Centre, an Australian maximum security prison for male and female inmates held on remand, is located in Hobart, Tasmania. The facility is operated by the Tasmanian Prison Service, an agency of the Department of Justice of the Government of Tasmania. The facility accepts felons charged under Tasmanian and/or Commonwealth legislation pending legal proceedings; and also detains convicted felons, pending their classification and placement at other correctional facilities in Tasmania.

== Facilities ==
Opened in January 1999, the centre was built over five floors and accommodates 40 single-occupancy cells for persons awaiting trial, plus 10 cells for police watch house cases. All cells contain central heating, a shower, toilet and hand basin. Outdoor recreation space is provided in a secure area on the roof. The Remand Centre connects on one side directly to the Hobart Police Station and on the other side to the Courts of Petty Sessions, which greatly reduces prisoner movement.

In January 2007, nine inmates barricaded themselves inside the centre, resulting in police and prison officers in riot gear forcing entry after inmates went on a rampage, smashing windows and hurling objects. In 2010 it was revealed that the centre was holding inmates who were serving medium to long term sentences, including three inmates convicted of murder, two inmates convicted of rape, and one inmate convicted of armed robbery who has been held there for nine years.

== Notable inmates ==
- John Avery – a criminal lawyer who represented Port Arthur murderer, Martin Bryant, serving time for theft.
