= List of prisons in Jilin =

This is a list of prisons within Jilin province of the People's Republic of China.

Name	Enterprise name	City/County/District	Village/Town	Established	Notes
Baicheng Prison(白城监狱)	Baichengzi Farm				In Wujiahu
Changchun Northern Suburbs Prison(长春北郊监狱)	Changchun Northern Suburbs Prison Labor Services Company	Kuancheng District, Changchun			On January 18, 2004, over 200 inmates were released 2 days early
Changchun Prison(长春监狱)	Changchun Xinsheng Rubber Works Labor Service Company, Clothing Plant	Changchun			Roughly 1,000 inmates in 1990, produces Meihualu brand shoes
Tiebei Prison(铁北监狱)	Changchun Xinsheng Switch Factory; Clothing Plant; Fuxin Iron Arts Plant; Tiebei Color Steel Mill	Kuancheng District, Changchun			
Dunhua Prison(敦化监狱)		Dunhua			In Qiuligou
Gongzhuling Prison(公主岭监狱)	Jilin Gongzhuling Xinsheng Tire Plant	Gongzhuling			Produces Shuangqiang auto tires. 900 inmates in the early 1990s
Jiangcheng Prison(江城监狱)		Jilin City		1983	
Jilin Prison(吉林监狱)	Jilin Forging Equipment Factory; Zhiqing Clothing Processing Plant	Jilin City			Has 1,500 inmates, exports to Japan and the United States
Jingyue Prison(净月监狱)		Changchun			Inmates each have 22 m^{2} living space.
Liaoyuan Prison(辽原建于)	Liaoyuan Prison Labor Services Co.	Dongfeng County			
Meihekou Prison(梅河口监狱)	Shengli Coal Mine	Meihekou	Shengli, Xinhe	1984	
Mudanjiang Prison(牡丹江监狱)		Mudanjiang	Xinglong		
Jilin Juvenile Offender Detachment(吉林未成年犯管教所)		Changchun			Many inmates are 14-15
Jilin Women's Prison(吉林女子监狱)	Jilin Prov. Women's Prison Packing and Color Printing Plant	Changchun	Heizuizi, Xingfu		As of Apr. 2006 1,700 inmates, 1997 paroled 8 people (0.76%) out of 1,042 total inmates. 1998 paroled 5 (0.43%) of a total 1,155 inmates, 1999 paroled 5 (0.43%) out of 1,162 inmates.
Zhenlai Prison (吉林省镇赉监狱)	Zhenlai Livestock Farm; Sifangtuozi Farm	Sifangtuozi, Zhenlai County, Baicheng			In 1998, held 10,300 inmates and the complex had nine numbered prisons and three labour-reform units, about 208 km^{2} of cultivated land, and 10,300 prisoners in 1998. Alternate names: Sifangtuozi Prison (四方坨子监狱); formerly Zhenlai Labour-Reform General Brigade (镇赉劳改总队) and Zhenlai Branch of the Jilin Provincial Prison Administration (吉林省监狱管理局镇赉分局)
Siping Prison(四平监狱)	Shiling Cement Factory, Shuguang Construction Company, Knit Fabrics Plant	Lishu County, Siping City	Shiling		Held more than 1,000 prisoners as of 2004
Tonghua Prison(通化监狱)		Tonghua		1983	More than 1,000 prisoners
Xingye Prison(兴业监狱)	Clothing Factory	Changchun			
Yanji Prison(延吉监狱)		Yanji			
Yingcheng Prison(英城监狱)	Yingcheng Prison Mining Labor Reform Company	Siping City			
