= List of prisons in Shaanxi =

This is a list of prisons within Shaanxi province of the People's Republic of China.

Name	Enterprise name	City/County/District	Village/Town	Established	Notes
Ankang Prison	Qingkang Chemical Plant				
Baoji Prison	Shaanxi No. 2 Machine Tool Plant	Baoji		1953	Among the products are gear-hobbing machines Y3120, Y3150, Y8115 and YB3180 as well as YJ8916 gear machines and also SK8250 and SK8280 special-use machine tools
Cuijiagou Prison	Cuijiagou Coal factory				About 6,400 inmates
Fuping Prison	Shaanxi Fuping Prison Water Pump Factory	Fuping County, Shaanxi	Zhuangli		All prisoners serve sentences of 10 years or more
Hancheng Prison	Hancheng Coal Coking Factory; No. 2 Prison Section Coal Mine	Hancheng, Shaanxi		1984	
Hanjiang Prison	Hanzhong Qidi Printing Co. Ltd.; Shaanxi Prov. Steel Pipe Plant; Hanjiang Glassworks; Xinhan Brickyard	Hantai District, Hanzhong	Shili		
Hanzhong Prison	Shaanxi Agate Iron Works	Hantai District, Hanzhong	Laojun		
Hongshiyan Prison	Hongshiyan Coal Mine	Huangling County			
Huangling Prison	Shangzhenzi Farm	Huangling County			
Huashan Prison	Lianhuasi Stonecutting Factory; Tianran Soda Water Plant	Hua County, Shaanxi	Lianhuasi		Produces Lianshi calcium superphosphate
Malan Prison	Malan Prison Farm	Xunyi County, Xianyang		1952	300 inmates as of 2006
Provincial Women's Prison	Xi'an Carton Factory; Clothing Factory	Weiyang District, Xi'an		1955	About 1,300 inmates
Qujiang Prison		Xi'an			
Shangzhou Prison		Shangzhou District			
Tongchuan Prison	Tongchuan Copper Mine; Xinchuan Cement Plant	Tongchuan, Shaanxi		1958	Cement of Xinchuan brand is produced
Xi'an Prison	Tangdu Machine Factory	Yanta District, Xi'an			
Yan'an Prison	Sanbao Building Materials Co. Ltd.	Baota District, Yan'an	Lin and Liulin		1,500 inmates in 2004
Yanta Prison	Shaanxi No. 2 Automobile Manufacturing Plant	Yanta District, Xi'an			
Zhuangli Prison	Dubao Steel Ball Factory	Fuping County, Shaanxi	Zhuangli	1967	

== Sources ==
- "Laogai Handbook 2007-2008" (PDF) (in Chinese and English). Washington, D.C.: Laogai Research Foundation. October 2008. ISBN 978-1-931550-25-3.
