= Botafuegos Prison =

One of the main prisons in Andalusia

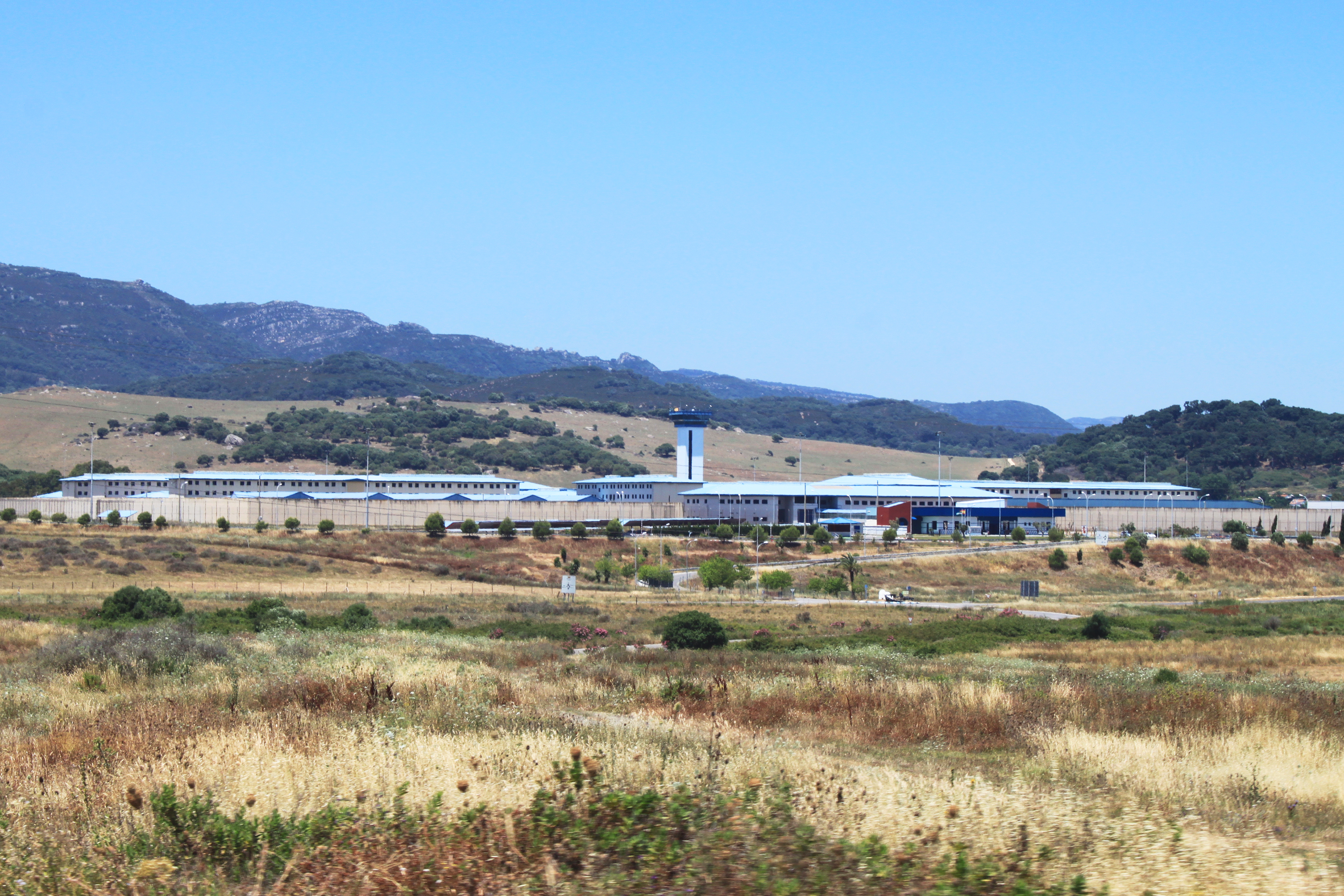

- Location within Andalusia
- Location: Algeciras, Spain; 36°08′40.4″N 5°29′08.2″W
- Status: Operational
- Capacity: 1500
- Population: 1800 (2007)
- Opened: 2000; 26 years ago

Botafuegos Prison (Spanish: Cárcel de Botafuegos) is one of the main prisons in Andalusia, located in the municipality of Algeciras. ETA (separatist group) members were interred here.
