= Presidio of Ahu =

Former prison in Brazil

Presidio of Ahú was a prison in the city of Curitiba, Paraná, Brazil.

It was the first prison in Curitiba, opened in 1905. Closed in 2006, now is the site of recordings for film and television, such as:

- Estomago;
- 400 contra 1;
- O Astro (2011): soap opera of the television produced by Rede Globo de Televisão.
