= Kragskovhede State Prison =

Open prison in Denmark

Coordinates: 57.5231°N 10.3970°E

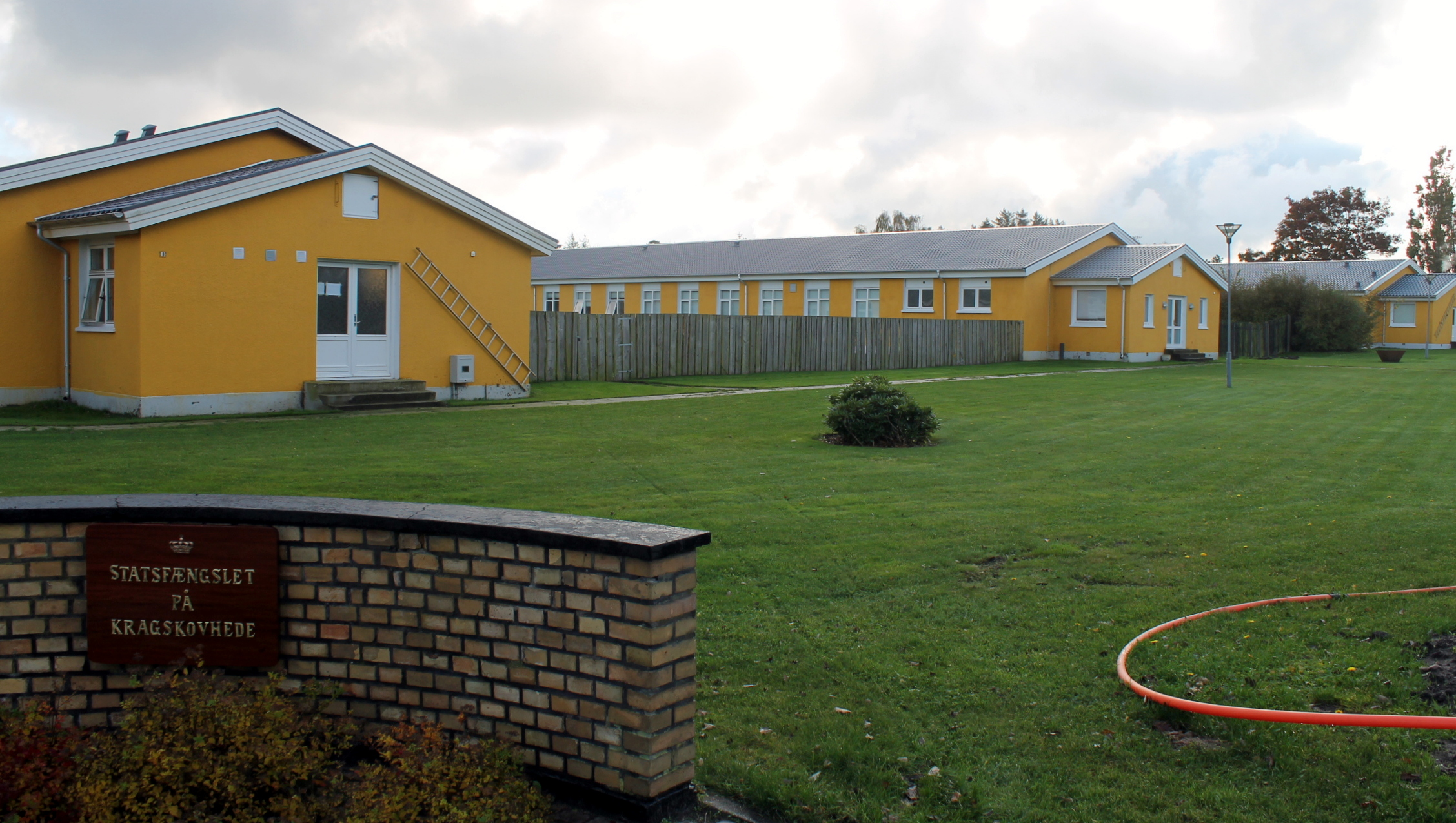
- Interactive map of Kragskovhede State Prison
- Location: Jerup, North Denmark Region, Denmark.
- Status: Operational
- Security class: open prison
- Capacity: 211
- Opened: 1948
- Managed by: The Danish Prison and Probation Service
- Warden: Lene Theilgaard

The State Prison of Kragskovhede is an open prison in Denmark. The prison is located between the towns of Frederikshavn and Skagen and about two kilometers from the railway town of Jerup in Krageskov Moor. The prison has 1,500 acres of land, some of which is used for agriculture.

== History ==
- 1930 - Camp set as a labor camp for voluntary measure for the young unemployed.
- 1943 - Camp taken over by the German occupiers forces in Denmark to accommodate troop transports, equipment and prisoners of war.
- 1945 - On 27 August the camp was taken over by the Danish prison system under the name Criminal camp at Kragskovhede. It was used among other things to house traitors of Denmark.
- 1947 - the last traitor leave the camp and it is now being designed to house criminals.

== Capacity ==
The State Prison of Kragskovhede have a capacity to house 211 prisoners and has a staff of approximately 170. The prison has two treatment and rehabilitation departments. One of the treatment and rehabilitation departments is operated in collaboration with a local drug treatment center outside the prison and mostly work with drug rehabilitation. The other treatment and rehabilitation department focus specifically on treatment against alcohol abuse. The prison also offers cognitive proficiency and anger management programs to prisoners.

== Employment ==
The prisoners at the State Prison of Kragskovhede have the opportunity to work in a large range of different jobs during their imprisonment. The prisoners at this prison mostly work with either agriculture, forestry, work in relation to the wood and timber industry, laundry and cleaning, construction or assembly work.

== Education Programs ==
The prisoners at the State Prison of Kragskovhede can attend either Preparatory Adult Education, General Adult Education and Special Education depending on the individual prisoners needs and educational level. The prisoners also have the opportunity to commence or continue vocational training in either carpentry, painting or industrial work.

== Sources ==
- Slægts- og Lokalhistorisk Forening, Frederikshavn, årsskrift 2007, Kragskovhede

== External reference ==
- The State Prison of Kragskovhede - Own website
- The State Prison of Kragskovhede - The Danish Prison and Probation Service website
