= Launceston Reception Centre =

Prison in Tasmania, Australia

- Interactive map of Launceston Reception Centre
- Location: Launceston, Tasmania; 41.4356°S 147.136°E
- Status: Operational
- Security class: Maximum (male and female)
- Capacity: 33
- Opened: circa 1839 (as Launceston Gaol); 1917 (as Police watch house); 1976 (in Police building)
- Managed by: Tasmanian Prison Service

Launceston Reception Centre, formerly the Launceston Remand Centre, an Australian maximum security prison for male and female inmates held on remand, is located in Launceston, Tasmania. The facility is operated by the Tasmanian Prison Service, an agency of the Department of Justice of the Government of Tasmania. The facility accepts felons charged under Tasmanian and/or Commonwealth legislation pending legal proceedings; and also detains convicted felons, pending their classification and placement at other correctional facilities in Tasmania.

== History ==
Convicts transported from England's overflowing prison system made a major contribution to Tasmania's settlement and development. Although some convicts returned to the United Kingdom at the completion of their sentence, a substantial number settled to become the farmers and business and professional people who helped build Tasmania into a thriving community. When transportation ceased in 1853, Tasmania was left with persons who still had lengthy sentences to complete. There was also a system of prison buildings and probation stations strategically located around Tasmania to serve the needs of convicts who were allocated to work on farms or public works such as road and bridge building. As the remaining number of convicts reduced, country prisons and probation stations, including Port Arthur, fell into disuse. The existing facilities left over from colonial times in Hobart and Launceston became the basis of the Tasmanian prison system for those persons who committed offences within Tasmania.

Records from Launceston Gaol date back to 1839. By 1900, the Launceston Gaol, which by then held only a small number of short-term prisoners, was under the control of a superintendent who reported to the governor in Hobart. Female prisoners were kept in an annex attached to the male prison. The main purpose of the Launceston Gaol was as a repository for persons required to appear in courts in Launceston and those in transit to courts on the North West Coast. In 1914 part of the Launceston prison site was given to the Education Department for a new high school. The incompatibility of the new high school and the prison immediately adjacent resulted in the prison site being completely abandoned and the prison function transferred to the police watch house in 1917. The condition of the watch house was no better than the prison but continued in use until 1976 when new police buildings were constructed. The management of the Launceston Gaol was handed over to the Police department after World War I although the prisoners remained the responsibility of the prison system. A police officer in Launceston and each of the major towns was appointed as gaoler under the prison legislation to provide administrative control of prisoners outside Hobart. This system persisted until 1991 when full control and staffing of the prison function in Launceston was returned to Corrective Services.

== Facilities ==
The centre has been described as an "horrendously bad building" and since the mid–1970s has provided short–term accommodation with 33 cells. It is located in the main police building and provides short-term remand and watch house accommodation. In 1991 bars on the doors were replaced with solid doors and there are two observation cells.
