= List of prisons in Xinjiang =

This is a list of prisons within Xinjiang region of the People's Republic of China.

Name	Enterprise name	City/County/District/Prefecture	Village/Town	Established	Notes
A'ertai Prison	A'ertai Gold Mine				
Autonomuous Region No. 4 Prison		Ürümqi			
Baicheng Prison	Baicheng Coal Mine		Baicheng County		
Buya Prison					
Changji Prison	Xiabahu Farm; Cement Mill; Quarry; Changji Prison Coal Mine; Xingwang Knitting Factory	Changji Hui Autonomous Prefecture			
Donggebi Prison	Donggebi Farm; Xinjiang Prov. Plant for Zinc and Lead		Ürümqi		
Fuhai Prison	Fuhai Prison Grain and Oil Processing Factory; Fuhai Coal Mine	Fuhai County, Altay Prefecture and Tacheng Prefecture			
Halabula Prison		Künes County, Ili Kazakh Autonomous Prefecture	Halabula		
Halihuqi Prison	Halihuqi Farm	Kashgar Prefecture			
Ili Juvenile Offender Detachment	Ili JOD, Chicken Farm				
Ka'erdun Prison	Ka'erdun Farm	Aksu Prefecture			
Kashgar Juvenile Offender Detachment		Shufu County	Shaiman		
Keriya Prison	Keriya Farm	Keriya County			1,400 inmates with sentences of 15 years or less
Kuchar Prison	Kuchar Prison Farm Ginnery; Kuchar Prison Coal Mine	Kuqa County, Aksu Prefecture	Qiman		
Pailou Prison	Pailou Farm Brickyard	Yarkant County, Kashgar Prefecture	Dunbage		
Reform Through Labor Prison		Korla			
Shayar Prison	Shayar Talimu Farm	Xayar County, Aksu Prefecture			
Talimu Prison	Talimu Livestock Farm; Cotton Processing Plant; Brickyard	Xayar County, Aksu Prefecture			
Turpan Prison	Cement Plant	Turpan, Turpan Prefecture	Daheyan		
Urumqi Juvenile Offender Detachment	Urumqi JOD Yucai Industrial Trade Company	Xinshi District, Ürümqi		1956	Ethnic groups present include Mongolians, Han, Hui and Uyghurs
Wusu Prison	Wusu Prison Coal Mine	Wusu			
Xinjiang No. 1 Prison	Xinjiang No. 3 Machine Tool Works; Cement Plant; Xinjiang No. 1 Prison Paper Products Plant; Xinjiang No. 1 Prison Prison Cashmere Workshop	Ürümqi		1958	A third are ethnic minorities
Xinjiang No. 5 Prison	Xinjiang No. 5 Xieli Sand Plant	Ürümqi			
Xinjiang Prod. & Const. Corps 6th Agricultural Div. Fangcaohu Prison	Fangcaohu Farm	Hutubi County			
Xinjiang Prod. & Const. Corps 6th Agricultural Div. Xinhu Prison	Yuxin Cotton Ginnery; Xinhu Farm	Manas County, Changji Hui Autonomous Prefecture			
Xinjiang Prod. and Const. Corps Xishan Prison	Xishan Compound Fertilizer Plant			1991	
Xinjiang Prod. & Const. Corps 7th Agricultural Div. Kuitun Prison	Kuitun Hongshan Coal Mine	Karamay and Ili Kazakh Autonomous Prefecture	Gongqing and Kuytun		
Xinjiang Uyghur Aut. Region Hotan Prison	Xinjiang Hotan Prison Internal Power Plant		Tashkurgan Town		
Xinjiang Women's Prison	Urumqi Commodity Chemical Plant; Xinjiang Women's Prison Embroidery Workshop	Ürümqi		1953	
Yi'ning Prison	Puli Uranium Mine	Ghulja			

== Sources ==
- "Laogai Handbook 2007-2008" (PDF) (in Chinese and English). Washington, D.C.: Laogai Research Foundation. October 2008. pp. 467–486. ISBN 978-1-931550-25-3.
