= Canton Mombello Prison =

Prison in Brescia, Italy

- The prison in 2021
- Interactive map of Canton Mombello Prison
- Location: Via Spalto San Marco 20, Brescia, Italy; 45.5335°N 10.2307°E
- Status: Operational
- Security class: Casa circondariale
- Capacity: 182
- Population: 370 (5 November 2026)
- Opened: 1914
- Managed by: Ministry of Justice
- Governor: Francesca Paola Lucrezi

Canton Mombello Prison (Italian: Carcere di Canton Mombello), officially the Casa circondariale "Nerio Fischione", is a prison in Brescia, Lombardy, Italy. Opened in 1914, it is one of the most overcrowded prisons in the country. On 5 November 2026 it held 370 inmates, against a capacity of 182 places. In May 2025 the Court of Audit found it to be the prison with the highest overcrowding rate in Italy, at 205 per cent.

The original plan to expand Brescia's other prison, at Verziano, included the closure of Canton Mombello. In 2026 local newspapers reported that the current project would not lead to its closure.

== History ==
The prison was designed at the end of the 19th century and opened in 1914. It has a T-shaped plan running from north to south, with a watchtower and about 150 cells, next to a wing of offices.

During the Fascist period the prison held up to about one thousand inmates, against a planned capacity of three hundred. Political prisoners were interrogated and tortured there. Among them was the partisan Agape Nulli, who was interrogated in the prison by the SS officer Erich Priebke.

In 1944 about two hundred inmates organised a mass escape during an air raid nearby, led by the partisan Leonardo Speziale. Many of them reached the mountains around Brescia, and a few weeks later the 122nd Garibaldi Brigade was formed from this group.

== Nerio Fischione ==
On 5 August 1974 three armed inmates tried to escape and took the prison guard Nerio Fischione hostage. He shut a gate behind him to stop them and was shot by one of the men. The escape failed, and Fischione died of his wounds in hospital on 13 August. In 2016 the prison was named after him.

== Overcrowding ==
After the war overcrowding remained chronic. In March 2012 a report by the Corriere della Sera described Canton Mombello as the most overcrowded prison in Italy, with almost 600 inmates in a building meant for 200. In January 2024, according to data released by Italy's national ombudsman for prisoners, it had an occupancy rate of 205 per cent, the second highest in Italy after San Vittore in Milan. In December 2025, according to Ministry of Justice data analysed by Ristretti Orizzonti, it was fourth in Italy, at 214 per cent.

At the end of August 2026 the prisoners' rights association Antigone listed it among the most overcrowded prisons in Italy, at 210 per cent.

== Conditions ==
In May 2024 a reporter of La Stampa who visited the prison counted 391 inmates in a building meant for 185. Some cells had up to 15 beds, stacked up to the ceiling. Hot water came only from the shower, a pipe above an old squat toilet, and the toilet area was also used as a kitchen. Meals were eaten in shifts because there was not enough room for everyone. On 14 May 2024 a delegation of the criminal lawyers' association Unione delle Camere Penali Italiane counted 389 inmates, with 180 prison police officers in service out of 227 planned.

In August 2024 Irma Conti, a member of the board of the national ombudsman for prisoners, visited the prison. Bresciaoggi reported that one room held fifteen inmates and that they used the same small space to cook and wash.

In December 2025, according to the same Ministry of Justice data analysed by Ristretti Orizzonti, the prison had no facilities for disabled inmates and 91 showers for 389 inmates. In June 2026 Bresciaoggi reported that up to fifteen people were sharing a cell during the summer heat.

== Verziano expansion ==
Since 2016 Canton Mombello and Brescia's other prison, at Verziano, have been run by a single management, although they remain separate facilities. The government has financed the construction of a new block inside the area of Verziano prison. At a meeting in March 2025, judges and the prison director warned that building inside the walls would take away the spaces used for recreation. The participants considered expropriating land next to the prison for this purpose.

The building site was due to open on 28 September 2026. In November 2026 Massimo Parisi, deputy head of the prison administration department, said that the official schedule set the end of the work at the end of 2027, but that it could slip. The new block is planned to have 340 places. A renovation of the north wing of Canton Mombello, with showers in the cells, is also being studied.
