= List of prisons in Jiangxi province =

This is a list of prisons within Jiangxi province of the People's Republic of China.

Name	Enterprise name	City/County/District	Village/Town	Established	Notes
Changbei Prison		Xinjian County, Nanchang	Changleng	1953	Inmates serve sentences of 15 years or more
Ganbin Prison	Zhugang Farm	Nanchang		1964	
Ganjiang Prison	Jiangxi Zhugang Farm	Xinjian County, Nanchang		1961	Jianwei brand rice is produced
Ganxi Prison	Jiangxi Xinmao Industrial Development Ltd. (Jiangxi Xinhua Coal Mine; Jiangxi Xinhua Cement Plant)	Gao'an	Bajing	1958	
Ganzhou City Detention Center					
Ganzhou Prison		Ganzhou	Shuinan		
Hongcheng Prison	Clothing Factory; Wire-pulling Factory; Maidikang Medical Equipment Factory	Nanchang		1962	Inmates serving sentences of 10 years or more
Hongdu Prison	Chengxin Farm; Chengxin Industries Ltd.	Xinjian County, Nanchang		1955	
Jingde Prison	Jiangxi Funan Mine	Jingdezhen		1956	
Nanchang Prison	Guanghua Plastics Ltd.; Clothing Factory				
Prov. Women's Prison	Nanchang Chemical Fiber Factory; Jiangxi Debaolu Industries Ltd.	Xinjian County, Nanchang	Changleng	1958	
Raozhou Prison	Jiangxi Zhuhu Antibiotics Factory; Jiangxi Zhuhu Pharmaceutical Factory; Jiangxi Zhuhu MSG Factory; Weixin Farm	Poyang County		1954	In Zhuhushan, roughly 5,000 prisoners, largest prison in province
Wenzhen Prison		Xinjian County, Nanchang	Wenzhen		
Yuzhang Prison	Jiangxi Prov. Fire Engine Manufacturing Plant; Changzhou Farm	Xinjian County, Nanchang	Changleng	1958	Over 2,000 inmates, 90% serving commuted death sentences
