= List of prisons in Shandong =

This is a list of prisons within Shandong province of the People's Republic of China.

Name	Enterprise name	City/County/District	Village/Town	Established	Notes
Beishu Prison	Shandong Beishu Shengjian Graphite Mine; Qingdao Tuanchan Multi-Functional Water Works; Beishu Prison Steel Tube Plant	Laixi	Nanshu	1954	
Chengwu Prison	Chengwu Farm	Chengwu County			
Dezhou Prison	Dezhou Shengjian Machinery Factory; Tuqiao Farm	Dezhou		1948	
Heze Prison	Heze Shengjian Machine Works	Heze		1949	Among the products are YTR460 supple vision printer, JBBT50/3 ellipse rubber machine, PJR series paperback hot glue machine, GPY450 high speed collator, QS series three cut book machine, UV series glazing machine, LRY air conditioning unit
Ji'nan Prison	Shandong Zhongqi Shanfeng Wooden Furniture Co. Ltd.	Jinan	Dangjia		More than 2,000 inmates in 2003, produces Shanfeng brand furniture
Ji'ning Prison	Caiyuan Coal Mine, Jinqiao Coal Mine, Flour Factory	Weishan County, Shandong	Huancheng		Nearly 6,000 prisoners in 17 years, number of prisoners in excess of 1,000
Lanxi Prison	Qingdao Shengjian Machine Works, Qingdao Shengjian Machine Tool	Licang District, Qingdao		1950	
Liaocheng Prison	Liaocheng Shengjian Auto Parts Factory			1949	
Lijin Prison	Lijin Farm	Lijin County			
Linyi Prison	Linyi Tianhe Machine Works	Linyi		1951	
Lunan Prison	Sanhekou Coal Mine	Weishan County, Shandong	Fushan	1984	
Luning Prison	Liusi Farm, Lineng Group Xinhe Coal Mine	Jining, Shandong			More than 15,000 persons have served their terms since the prison was established
Luxi Prison (Provincial No. 7 Prison)	Luxi Prison Coal Mine	Weishan County, Shandong	Huancheng	1995	More than 2,000 prisoners in 2000
Luzhong Prison	Shandong Maohua Silicon Limited Company; Shandong Lineng Cement Limited Company	Zhangdian District, Zibo	Hutian	1962	
Province Prison Administrative Bureau Lineng sub-Bureau	Shandong Lineng Group				
Provincial Juvenile Offender Detachment		Jinan and Zibo		1954	
Provincial No. 1 Prison		Lixia District, Jinan	Ji'nan Shengjian Electrical Machinery Plant, Ji'nan Electric Power Equipment Factory	1955	Produces generator of Qilu brand
Provincial Women's Prison		Jinan			Held more than 2,000 prisoners
Qingdao Prison		Qingdao	Xifu	1903	Formerly called Licun Prison
Qizhou Prison	Liuyi Farm	Qihe County, Dezhou	Antou	1961	
Rencheng Prison	Luxi Coal Mine	Jining, Shandong			
Tengzhou Prison	Wusuotun Shengjian Coal Mine Power Plant, Tengdong Coal Mine	Tengzhou	Jiangtun	1983	
Weibei Prison	Weibei Farm Shandong Prov. Weibei Prison Paper Mill	Hanting District, Weifang		1952	
Weifang Prison	Weifang Shengjian Machinery Works	Weifang			
Weihai Prison	Luming Clothing Factory; Construction Materials Plant	Huancui District, Weihai	Yangting		Can hold 1,500 inmates
Weihu Prison	Daizhuang Shengjian Coal Mine	Weishan County, Shandong	Nansihu	1976	More than 3,300 inmates
Yunhe Prison	Qiwu Shengjian Coal Mine	Weishan County, Shandong	Huancheng		
Zaozhuang Prison	Jinzhuang Coal Mine	Zaozhuang	Weizhuang, Mushi		
Zibo Prison (Provincial No. 4 Prison)	Zibo Shengjian Machine Plant; Shandong Prov. No. 4 Prison, Labor Service Agency, Ball Press Factory	Zibo			Detained more than 2,000 persons in 1985

== Sources ==
- "Laogai Handbook 2007-2008" (PDF) (in Chinese and English). Washington, D.C.: Laogai Research Foundation. October 2008. pp. 377–406. ISBN 978-1-931550-25-3.
