= State Prison in Renbæk =

Open prison in Renbæk, Denmark

Coordinates: 55.1803°N 8.8903°E

Renbæk Prison
- Interactive map of Renbæk Prison
- Location: Skærbæk, Region of Southern Denmark, Denmark.
- Status: Operational
- Population: 160
- Opened: 1944
- Managed by: The Danish Prison and Probation Service

The Renbæk Prison is an open prison in Denmark located in Renbæk, 10 km. east of Skaerbaek.

The site originally housed a camp for young unemployed people in 1943 but was temporarily taken over by the Prison and Probation Service to house inmates from the open government work house program. The prison was taken over by the German occupiers, and in 1946 it was converted into a real state prison. During the 1960s, the majority of its present buildings were built on the site.

Of the prisons 160 seats only 14 is in double cells. Prison offers a range of courses, particularly in agriculture and forestry.
