= Luzhai County =

Luzhai County 鹿寨县 · Luzcai Yen
- County
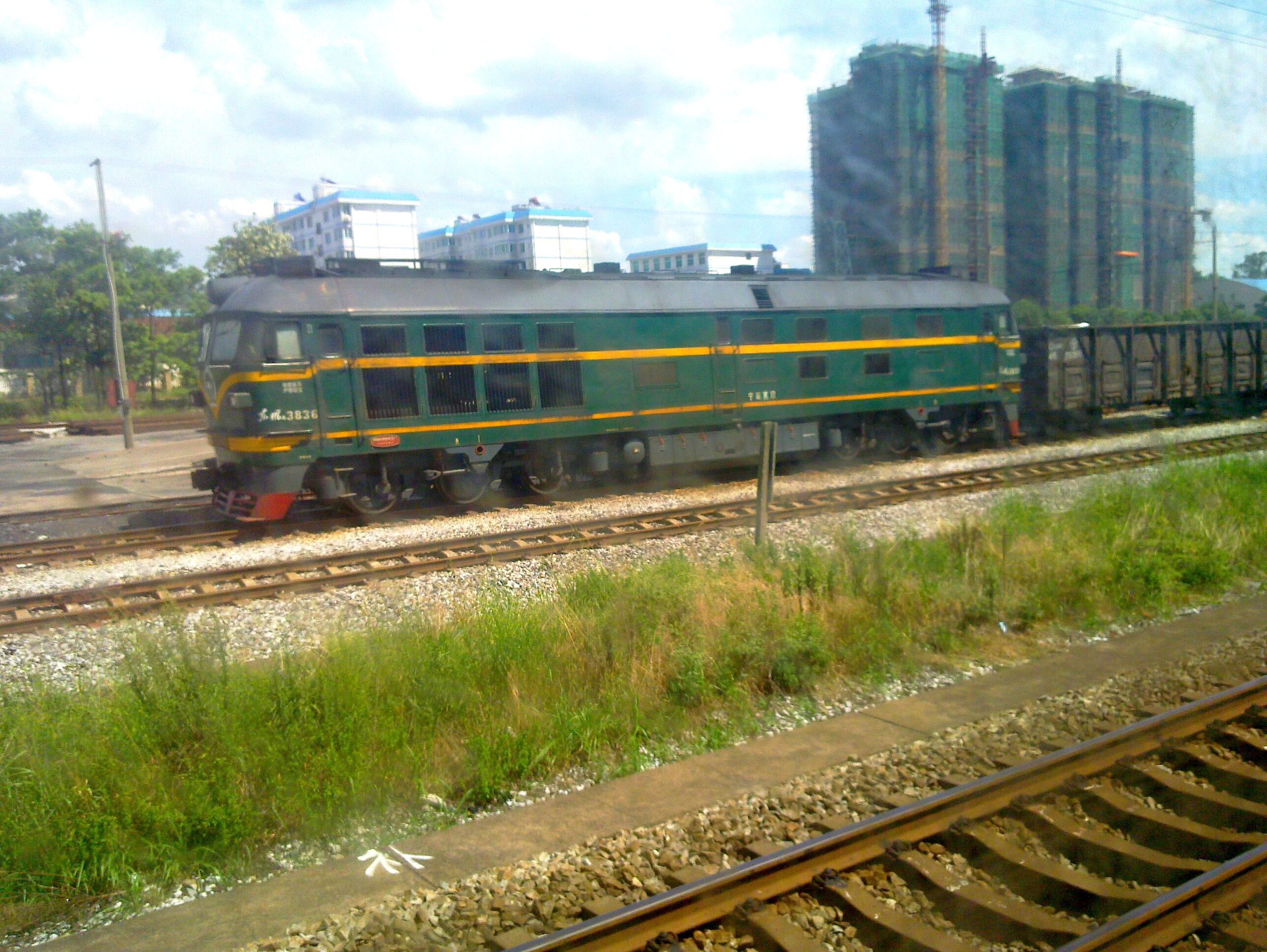

- Location in Guangxi
- Coordinates: 24°29′17″N 109°43′59″E
- Country: China
- Autonomous region: Guangxi
- Prefecture-level city: Liuzhou
- County seat: Luzhai Town

Area
  - Total: 3,358 km^{2} (1,297 sq mi)

Population (2010)
  - Total: 421,019
  - Density: 125.4/km^{2} (324.7/sq mi)
- Time zone: UTC+8 (China Standard)
- Postal code: 5456XX

Luzhai County (simplified Chinese: 鹿寨县; traditional Chinese: 鹿寨縣; pinyin: Lùzhài Xiàn; Standard Zhuang: Luzcai Yen) is under the administration of Liuzhou, Guangxi Zhuang Autonomous Region, China. The easternmost county-level division of Liuzhou City, it borders the prefecture-level cities of Guilin to the north and east and Laibin to the southeast.

== Administrative divisions ==
Luzhai County is divided into 6 towns and 3 townships:

towns

- Luzhai 鹿寨镇
- Zhongdu 中渡镇
- Zhaisha 寨沙镇
- Pingshan 平山镇
- Huangmian 黄冕镇
- Sipai 四排镇

townships

- Jiangkou 江口乡
- Daojiang 导江乡
- Lagou 拉沟乡

== Climate ==
Climate data for Luzhai, elevation 132 m (433 ft), (1991–2020 normals, extremes 1981–present)
Month	Jan	Feb	Mar	Apr	May	Jun	Jul	Aug	Sep	Oct	Nov	Dec	Year
Record high °C (°F)	28.4 (83.1)	33.2 (91.8)	33.9 (93.0)	35.8 (96.4)	36.4 (97.5)	37.3 (99.1)	39.5 (103.1)	41.3 (106.3)	39.0 (102.2)	37.0 (98.6)	34.1 (93.4)	29.4 (84.9)	41.3 (106.3)
Mean daily maximum °C (°F)	14.4 (57.9)	16.7 (62.1)	19.7 (67.5)	25.6 (78.1)	29.8 (85.6)	32.0 (89.6)	33.8 (92.8)	34.0 (93.2)	32.3 (90.1)	28.3 (82.9)	23.2 (73.8)	17.5 (63.5)	25.6 (78.1)
Daily mean °C (°F)	10.4 (50.7)	12.6 (54.7)	15.7 (60.3)	21.1 (70.0)	25.1 (77.2)	27.4 (81.3)	28.8 (83.8)	28.7 (83.7)	26.9 (80.4)	23.0 (73.4)	17.8 (64.0)	12.6 (54.7)	20.8 (69.5)
Mean daily minimum °C (°F)	7.8 (46.0)	9.8 (49.6)	12.9 (55.2)	17.9 (64.2)	21.6 (70.9)	24.3 (75.7)	25.3 (77.5)	25.2 (77.4)	23.2 (73.8)	19.3 (66.7)	14.3 (57.7)	9.3 (48.7)	17.6 (63.6)
Record low °C (°F)	−1.6 (29.1)	0.6 (33.1)	0.4 (32.7)	7.6 (45.7)	11.3 (52.3)	16.4 (61.5)	18.8 (65.8)	20.4 (68.7)	14.6 (58.3)	7.8 (46.0)	3.3 (37.9)	−2.5 (27.5)	−2.5 (27.5)
Average precipitation mm (inches)	63.3 (2.49)	48.5 (1.91)	114.1 (4.49)	157.9 (6.22)	243.1 (9.57)	336.4 (13.24)	196.5 (7.74)	165.0 (6.50)	73.1 (2.88)	56.1 (2.21)	59.6 (2.35)	44.9 (1.77)	1,558.5 (61.37)
Average precipitation days (≥ 0.1 mm)	11.3	11.9	17.0	15.8	16.3	18.1	15.8	13.7	8.5	6.4	8.1	8.8	151.7
Average snowy days	0.3	0.1	0	0	0	0	0	0	0	0	0	0.1	0.5
Average relative humidity (%)	70	73	78	78	78	81	79	77	72	66	67	65	74
Mean monthly sunshine hours	61.7	55.2	50.3	79.3	124.8	129.4	191.9	201.2	188.0	174.8	132.2	110.0	1,498.8
Percentage possible sunshine	18	17	13	21	30	32	46	50	52	49	41	34	34
Source: China Meteorological Administrationall-time October record
