= Vasalemma Parish =

Former municipality of Estonia

Coordinates: 59°15′N 24°17′E

Vasalemma Parish Vasalemma vald
- Former municipality of Estonia
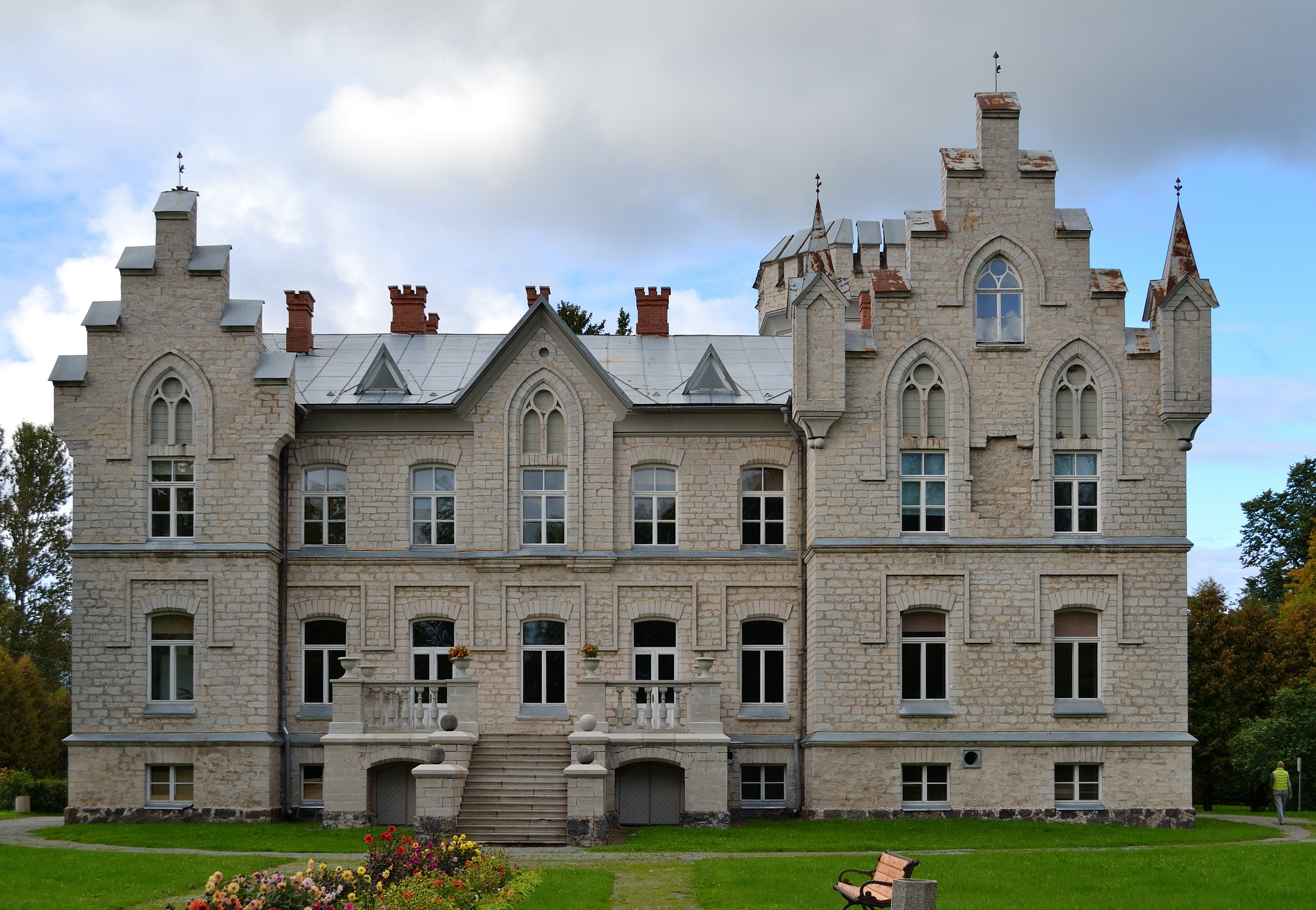
- Vasalemma manor house

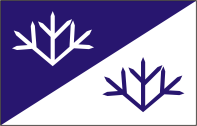
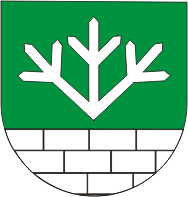
- Flag Coat of arms

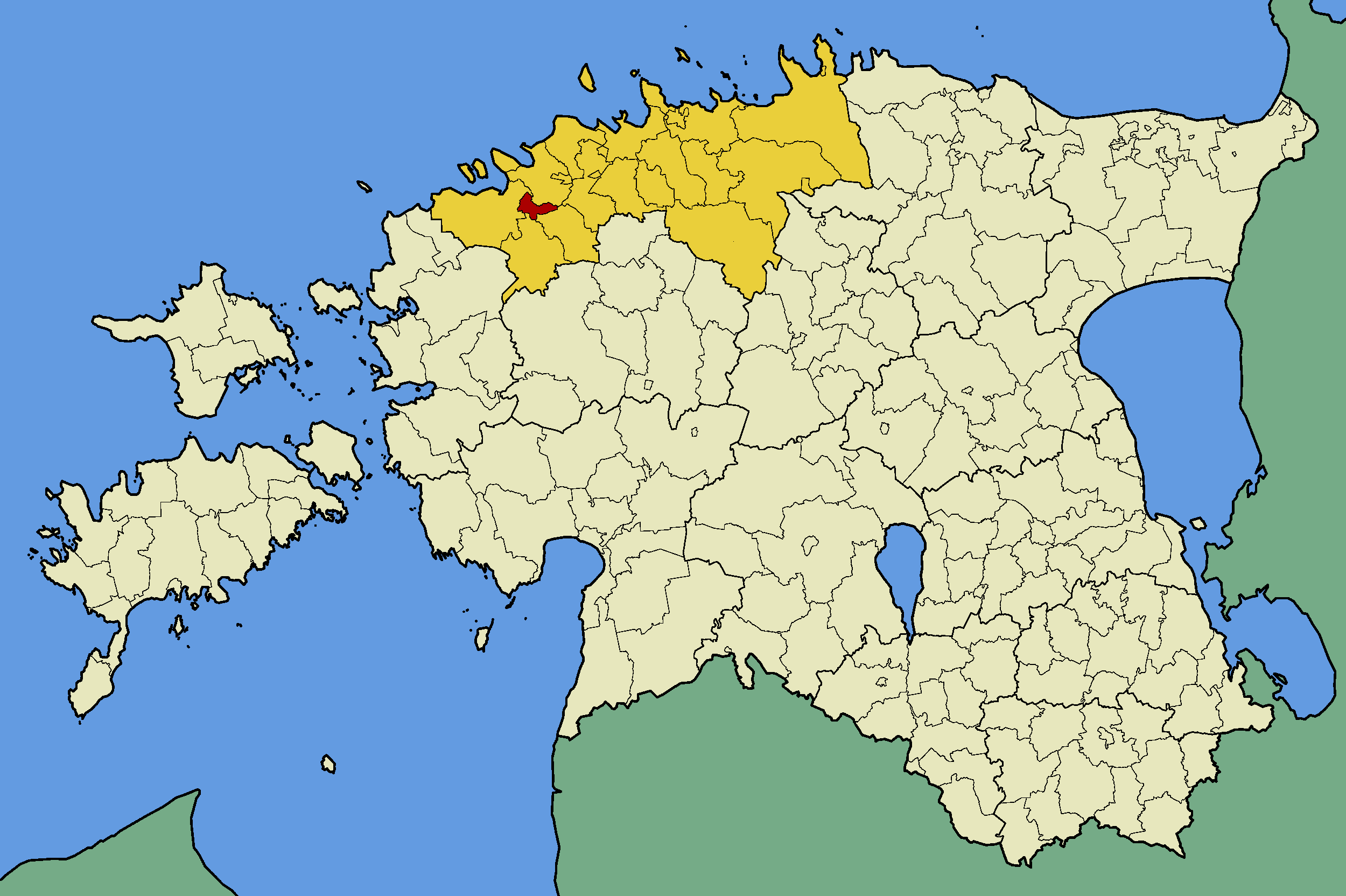
- Vasalemma Parish within Harju County
- Country: Estonia
- County: Harju County
- Administrative centre: Vasalemma

Government
  - Mayor: Mart Mets

Area
  - Total: 38.66 km^{2} (14.93 sq mi)

Population (01.01.2012)
  - Total: 4,991
  - Density: 129.1/km^{2} (334.4/sq mi)
- Website: www.vasalemma.ee

Vasalemma Parish (Estonian: Vasalemma vald) was a rural municipality in north-western Estonia. It was a part of Harju County. The municipality had a population of 4,991 (as of 1 January 2012) and covered an area of 38.66 km^{2}. The population density was 129.1 inhabitants per km^{2}.

Vasalemma Parish consisted of three small boroughs (alevik) (Vasalemma, Rummu, Ämari) and two villages (Veskiküla and Lemmaru).

The mayor (vallavanem) was Mart Mets.

== Gallery ==
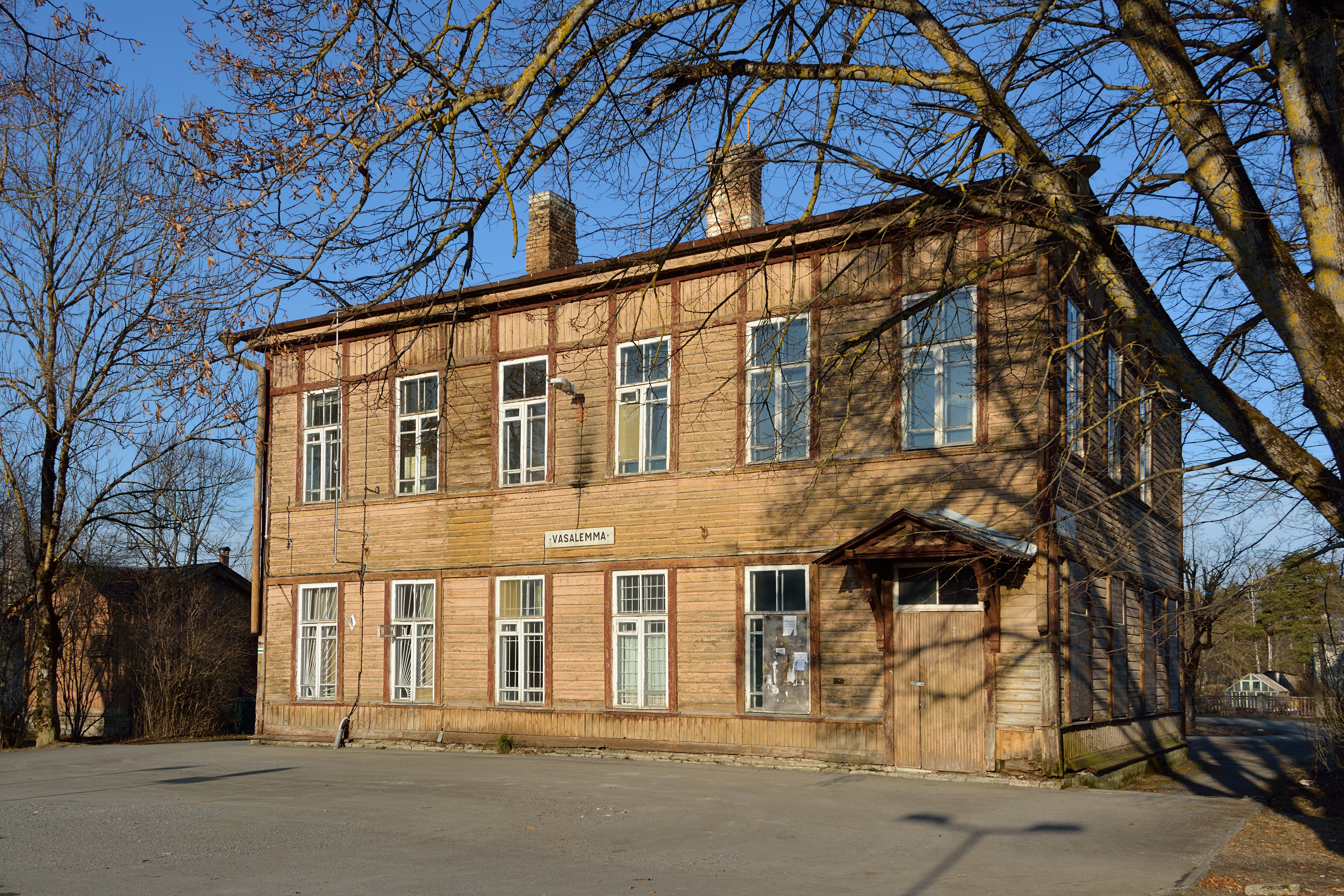
Vasalemma railway station

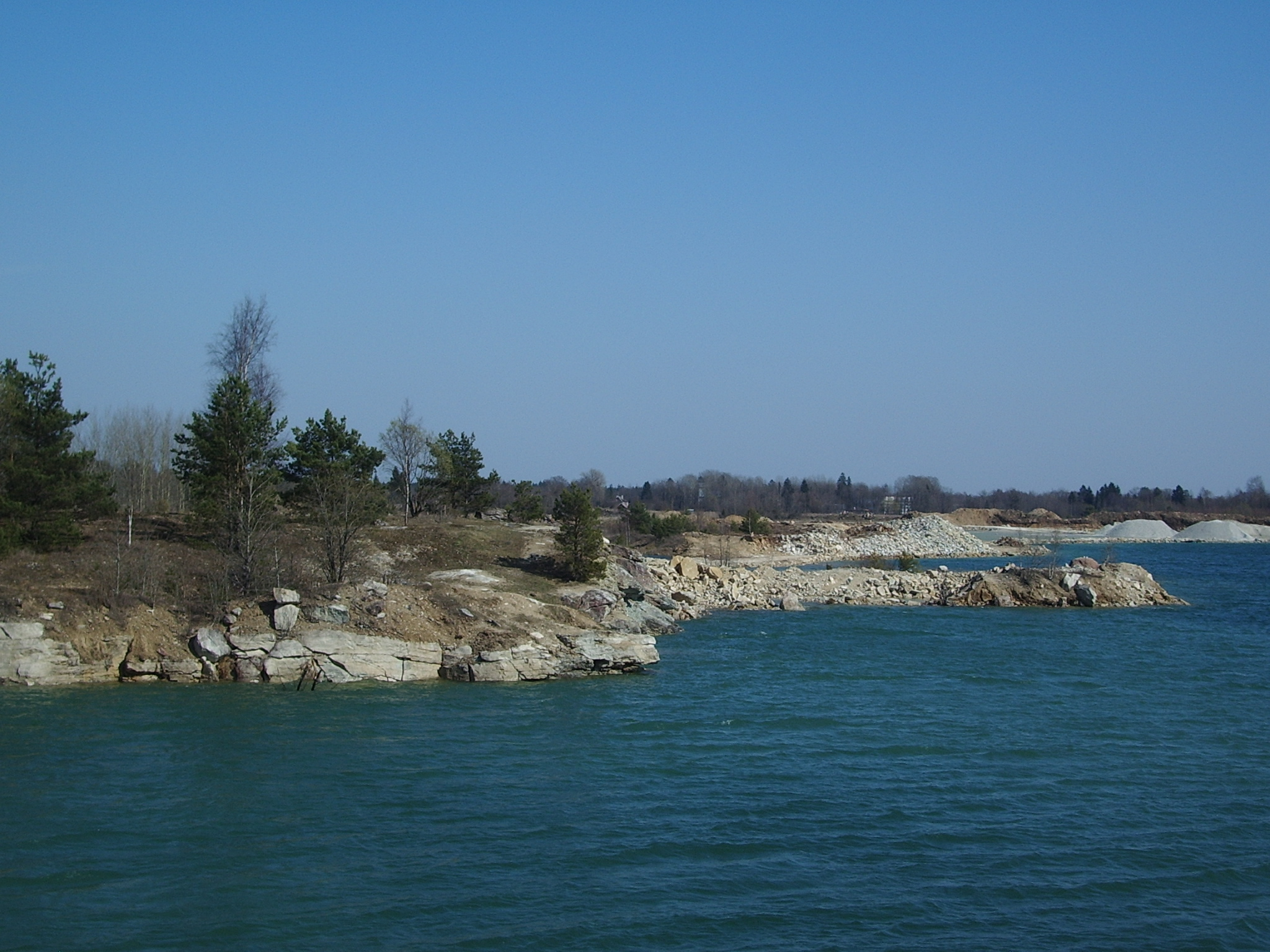
Rummu quarry

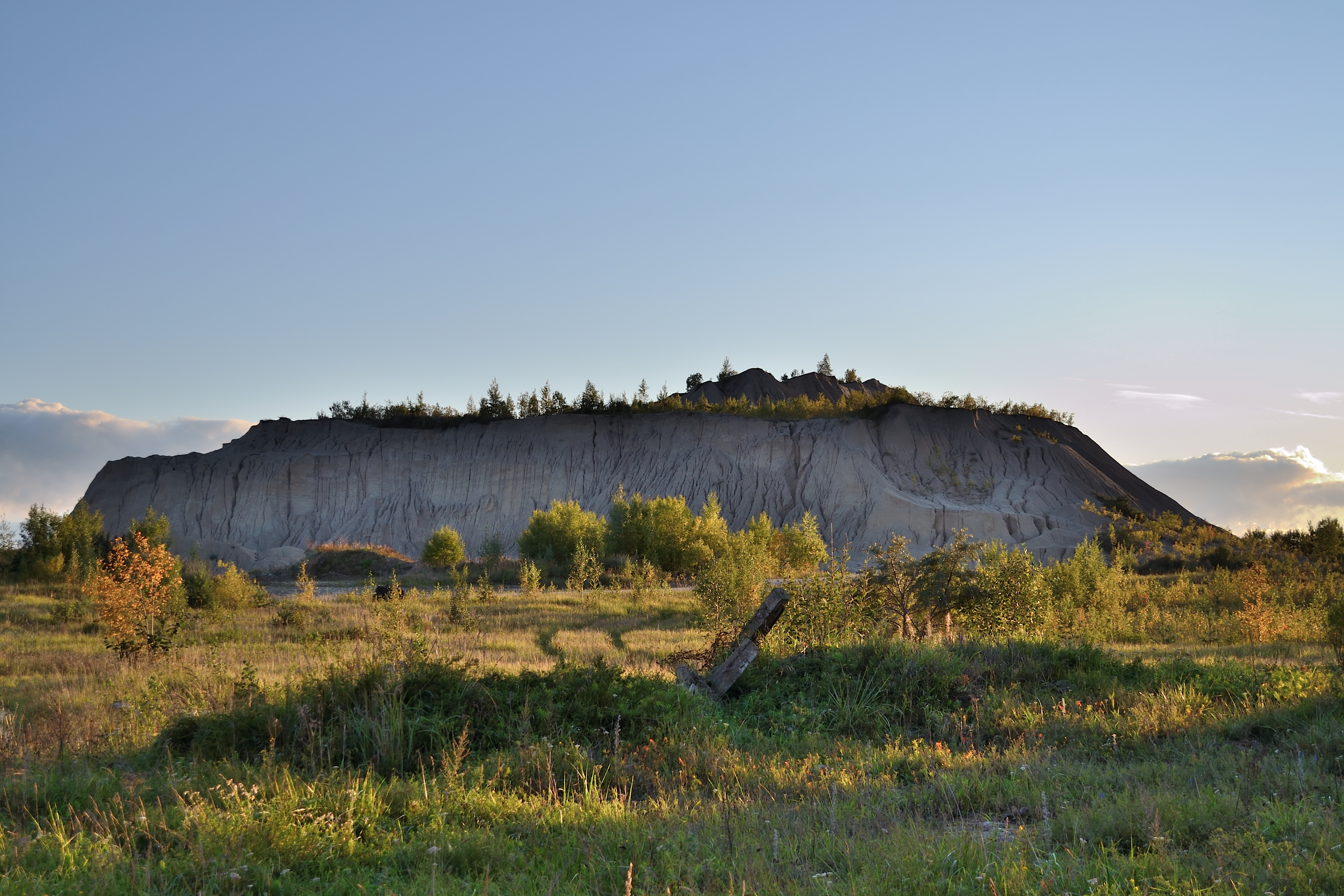
Spoil tip in Rummu

== See also ==
- Ämari Air Base
- Murru Prison
- Rummu Prison
- Rummu quarry
