= Vladimir Tenetov =

Soviet–Estonian serial killer

- Born: 1966; Ulyanovsk, Ulyanovsk Oblast, RSFSR
- Died: 6 March 2020 (aged 53); Tartu Prison, Estonia
- Other names: "The Lilleküla Murderer" "The Surgeon"
- Conviction: Murder x3
- Penalty: 15 years imprisonment; initially commuted to death then to life imprisonment

Details
- Victims: 3 (convicted); 4–11 (suspected)
- Span of crimes: 1991–1992
- Country: Soviet Union, later Estonia
- State: Harju
- Date apprehended: 6 January 1993

Vladimir Tenetov (Russian: Владимир Тенетов; 1966 – 6 March 2020), known as The Lilleküla Murderer (Estonian: Lilleküla mõrtsukas), was a Soviet–Estonian serial killer and rapist who raped, tortured, and murdered at least three young teenagers and women in Tallinn's Lilleküla district between 1991 and 1992. Tenetov was additionally suspected to be responsible for at least one other murder and possibly up to eleven in total, but was never charged for any of them.

Convicted for his two of his confirmed murders, he was initially given a 15-year sentence before this was overturned and changed to a death sentence. However, he was never executed and it was converted to a life term, which he served until his death in 2020.

== Early life ==
Vladimir Tenetov was born in 1966 in Ulyanovsk, Ulyanovsk Oblast, in the RSFSR. After spending his formative years there, his family moved to Tallinn in the Estonian SSR, where he grew up in a stable household, was a successful athlete and had an interest in martial arts. After graduating from high school, Tenetov enrolled in the Tallinn Maritime School, but did not manage to complete his studies.

In the mid-1980s, Tenetov was drafted into the Soviet Army for his compulsory military service, which he served in the Soviet Airborne Forces and took part in the Soviet–Afghan War. After being discharged from the Army, he returned to Tallinn, where he married a woman named Tatyana in 1988, and soon had a son with her.

For the next few years, Tenetov worked at various times as a bus driver for the Tallinn Bus Association before switching professions to be a dockworker and mechanic at the Port of Tallinn. Tenetov was regarded very positively by the people around him, who described him as an exemplary husband and father who kept calm and collected.

== Murders ==
=== Modus operandi ===
Unbeknownst to the people around him, Tenetov started targeting young teenage girls and women on the streets of Tallinn, being almost exclusively active in the Lilleküla district. As part of his modus operandi, he would use his attractive appearance to charm potential victims he met – most often, he would approach them on the streets or public areas such as bus stops or cafés. He would then lure the victim to a secluded area using some sort of excuse, after which he would proceed to rape, torture, and ultimately kill them.

=== Serial murders ===
Tenetov's first known murder took place in the year of 1991, but for reasons unknown, little to no information was released about this particular crime. As a result, it is often overlooked by news sources, leading to erroneous reports that Tenetov was only convicted of two murders in total.

On 7 August 1992, Tenetov was riding on a trolleybus when he approached a 20-year-old woman named Anna Zaitseva, who was going to a friend's birthday party. Tenetov asked if he could accompany her, to which Zaitseva agreed, but the pair failed to locate her friend, they instead return to the stop and boarded another trolley. They then ended at the "Aurelija" bar, where Zaitseva got heavily intoxicated. Tenetov then got her out and offered to walk her home. However, when they reached a more isolated area between Tehnika Street near the railroad tracks, he instead attempted to rape her. According to Tenetov's own testimony, he was unable to sustain an erection due to erectile dysfunction, leading to Zaitseva calling him "impotent". As he had indeed been treated for impotence in the past, Tenetov flew into a rage and proceeded to stab her several times with a knife in the face. He then gouged out her eyeballs, and strangled her using a belt from her waistcoat.

Zaitseva's naked body was found on the following day by a passer-by. Her jeans and underwear were found next to the body, while the belt was still wrapped around her neck. Due to the brutality of the crime, the Assistant Prefect of Tallinn, Sergei Kozlov, speculated that the murder was either committed by a mentally-ill person or by mobsters.

On 27 October, Tenetov and his co-workers were partying at the "Balti Jaam" restaurant near Baltic Station when he struck up a conversation with 16-year-old Irina Lebedeva. The pair then ate and drank alcohol late into the night, after which he offered to walk her home. In the vicinity of Tihase Street, after making sure there were no witnesses, Tenetov attacked Lebedeva, beating and raping her. Once he was done, he then proceeded to extensively torture her. He first gouged out her eyeballs with his knife before cutting up her abdomen and tearing out her small intestine barehanded, before stuffing the inside of her abdomen with a bundle of leaves. Tenetov then tore an 83-centimeter-long slat from a nearby fence and forcefully inserted it into Lebedeva's anus, causing severe lacerations to her rectum and other internal organs. He then left the crime scene by fleeing into some nearby bushes.

Lebedeva was found early on the following morning and immediately rushed to the nearest hospital's intensive care unit, where she succumbed to her injuries at around 1:30 AM. Positive identification of her identity took almost two weeks due to her extensive injuries, and was only successful due to the fact her parents recognized a birthmark. She was initially not reported missing due to her parents' belief that she was studying at a secretarial school in Saint Petersburg.

== Investigation and arrest ==
During the investigation into Lebedeva's murder, approximately 50 law enforcement officers interviewed a total of 10,000 across the city, but this did lead to an arrest. An interview with her father revealed that Lebedeva was supposed to visit a friend that day, but when queried, the friend said that they had not seen each other. After some time had passed with no leads, the investigation had its first breakthrough when the coroner examining the body revealed that, just hours prior to her death, Lebedeva had eaten shashlik.

This led to authorities searching for the closest possible eating establishment in the area where she was found, which was correctly identified as the restaurant close to Baltic Station. One employee positively identified a young teen he had seen as the victim after a photograph of her was shown, stating that the victim was accompanied by a young man who introduced himself as "Igor" and claimed to work at the port. Subsequently, authorities started interviewing dock workers, focusing on people who had the first name Igor – a total of 105 men were interviewed, but all had solid alibis and thus were eliminated as suspects.

In December of that year, investigators organized a stakeout at the restaurant, where undercover officers posed as patrons, hoping that the suspect would return to the establishment at some point. On 3 January 1993, an employee informed one of the officers that one of the customers that had just entered – Vladimir Tenetov – was the man last seen with Irina Lebedeva. Three days later, he was arrested at his home and brought in for questioning.

Initially, Tenetov confessed responsibility for only for the murders of Zaitseva and Lebedeva, but later recanted and proclaimed that he was only present at the murder and was not an active participant. His wife was also brought in for questioning, and while she confirmed that he had been drinking for some time, she insisted that Tenetov was never violent towards her. She also stated that one night, her husband had returned home covered in blood and claimed that he had killed someone, but she did not believe him and told him to wash off and go to bed.

== Trial and sentence ==
=== Delays ===
Following his arrest, Tenetov's trial faced multiple delays for a variety of reasons. The first concerned a hearing related to one of the rape charges against one of the victims during which two of the prosecution's main witnesses were absent, as they were visiting relatives in Russia. A second hearing was then postponed because the court was unable to find a pro bono lawyer for Tenetov and that the State did not have enough money to hire one.

=== Trial and death penalty debate ===
Tenetov's trial began in January 1994. Throughout the proceedings, the murders were often contrasted with Jack the Ripper, which the prosecutors used to point out how dangerous the defendant was. They also showed an almost hour-long recorded confession video in which Tenetov explained in detail how he carried out the crimes, which was described by contemporary newspapers as a "Russian-language pornographic audiobook". In contrast, the defense argued that all evidence against their client was circumstantial at best; that he supposedly confessed out of coercion and that the video was not permitted to be considered as evidence in the trial under the country's Code of Criminal Procedure.

Due to the extensive amount of evidence against him in the murders of Anna Zaitseva and Irina Lebedeva, he was convicted of their killings and sentenced to 15 years imprisonment by Judge Helge Särgava. Särgava justified her decision by pointing out that Tenetov had no previous criminal history and was well-regarded by those around him.

The Tallinn Prosecutor's Office immediately appealed the verdict on the grounds of it being way too lenient, succeeding in having it overturned by the Circuit Court and changed to a death sentence in late 1994. At the time, he was one of only four death row inmates in the country, alongside Sergei Krõlov, Vladimir Botško and Vasili Otškalenko. Unlike the other three, Tenetov never filed an appeal against his sentence, leading the Supreme Court to refuse to issue a ruling in his case. He later refused to apply for a pardon from President Lennart Meri, leading the Executive Board to file a request to carry out his death sentence. This request was denied by the Supreme Court.

The Tenetov case then became the main issues concerning the country's divided opinions on whether they should abolish or retain the death penalty, with the contemporary Minister of Justice Paul Varul calling the situation "abnormal".

However, Tenetov's death sentence was never carried out – under contemporary Estonian law, an execution could only be carried out within three years of the sentence being handed out. Subsequently, the Tallinn City Court commuted his death sentence to life, after which he was transferred to the Rummu Prison.

== Imprisonment ==
In the late 1990s, Tenetov contacted the Tallinn Prosecutor's Office in order to confess to additional murders he had not been linked to up until that point. Accounts vary as to how many killings he actually confessed to, with more conservative estimates claiming only two, while others claimed that it was nine. However, investigators failed to corroborate most of the claims or find any bodies, leading to him being implicated and convicted only for a single murder from 1991.

=== Prison assault ===
In the early 2000s, Tenetov's cellmate at the Rummu Prison was Oleg Pjatnitski, the first person in the history of post-Soviet Estonia to be sentenced to life imprisonment.

In 2002, a quarrel broke out between the two men, during which Tenetov lost his temper and beat up Pjatnitski. That same evening, after receiving medical treatment, Pjatnitski decided to take revenge on Tenetov and attacked him, stabbing him 11 times with a screwdriver and slashing his carotid artery with a utility knife. Despite his life-threatening injuries, Tenetov survived the attack, and Pjatnitski was later convicted of attempted murder and given an additional 9 years to be served concurrently with his existing life term.

Pjatnitski later gave an interview in which he talked about the events leading up to the attack. According to him, Tenetov was playing a videogame on the prison computer which had apparently been frozen, prompting Pjatnitski to comment that he should just turn it off. Supposedly, Tenetov then attacked him without provocation, leading to the attempted murder later that night. Pjatnitski himself expressed astonishment about the fact that he managed to live through that experience, claiming that Tenetov's survival was a "miracle from God."

== Death ==
In the early 2010s, Tenetov was transferred to the Tartu Prison after the closure of the Rummu Prison. By the end of the decade, he was diagnosed with a myriad of health issues, complications of which led to his death on 6 March 2020. He was aged 53.

== In the media and culture ==
Tenetov's crimes were covered on an episode from the documentary series Eluaegsed (English: Lifetimes), produced by Andres Anvelt and released in 2011.

In 2020, the case was covered again on the Eesti Roimad podcast (English: Estonian Crimes), hosted by Andres Anvelt and journalist Dagmar Lamp.

== See also ==
- List of serial killers by country
