= Rummu quarry =

Estonian quarry

Coordinates: 59.225897°N 24.197682°E

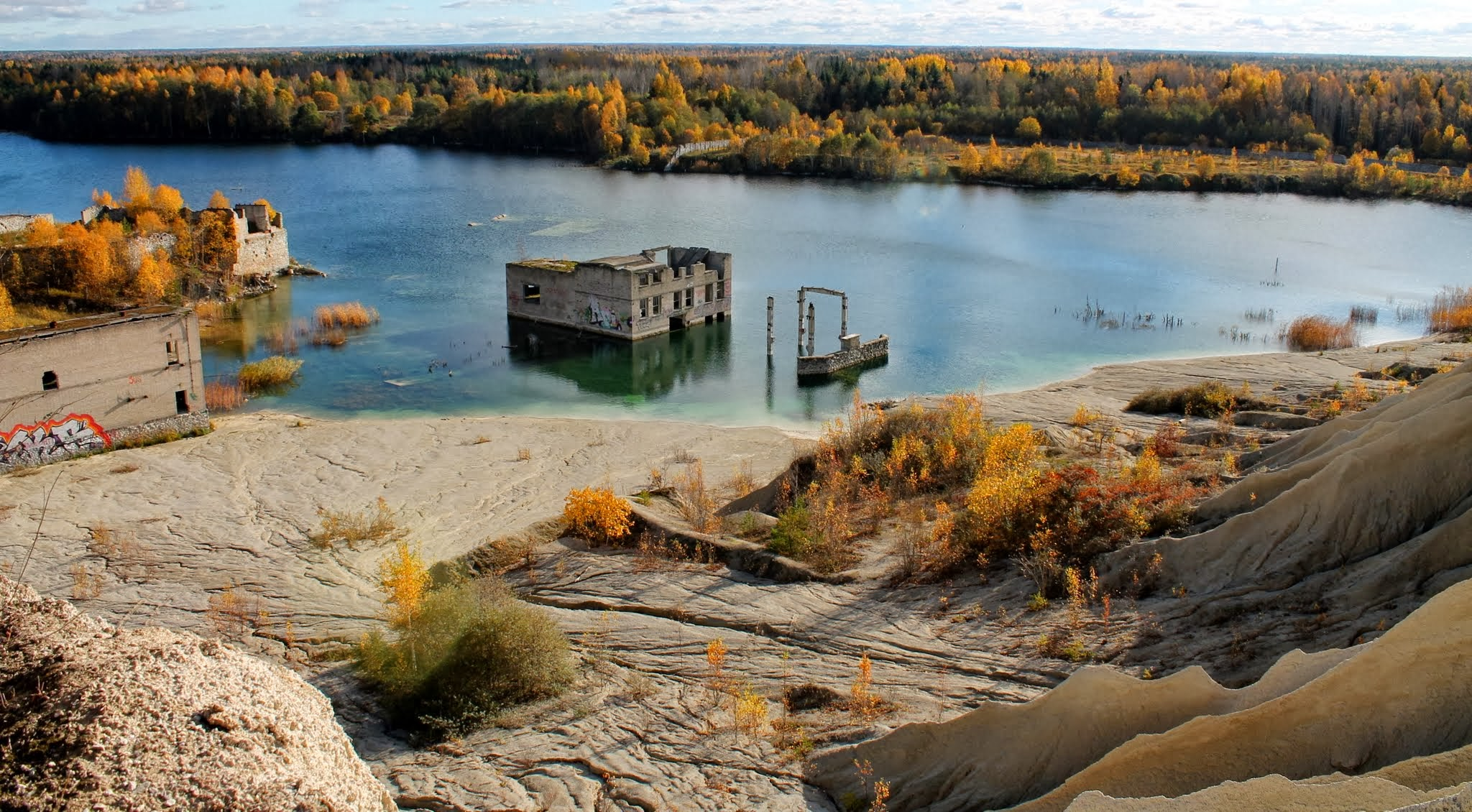
Rummu quarry in October 2013 as seen from the spoil tip.

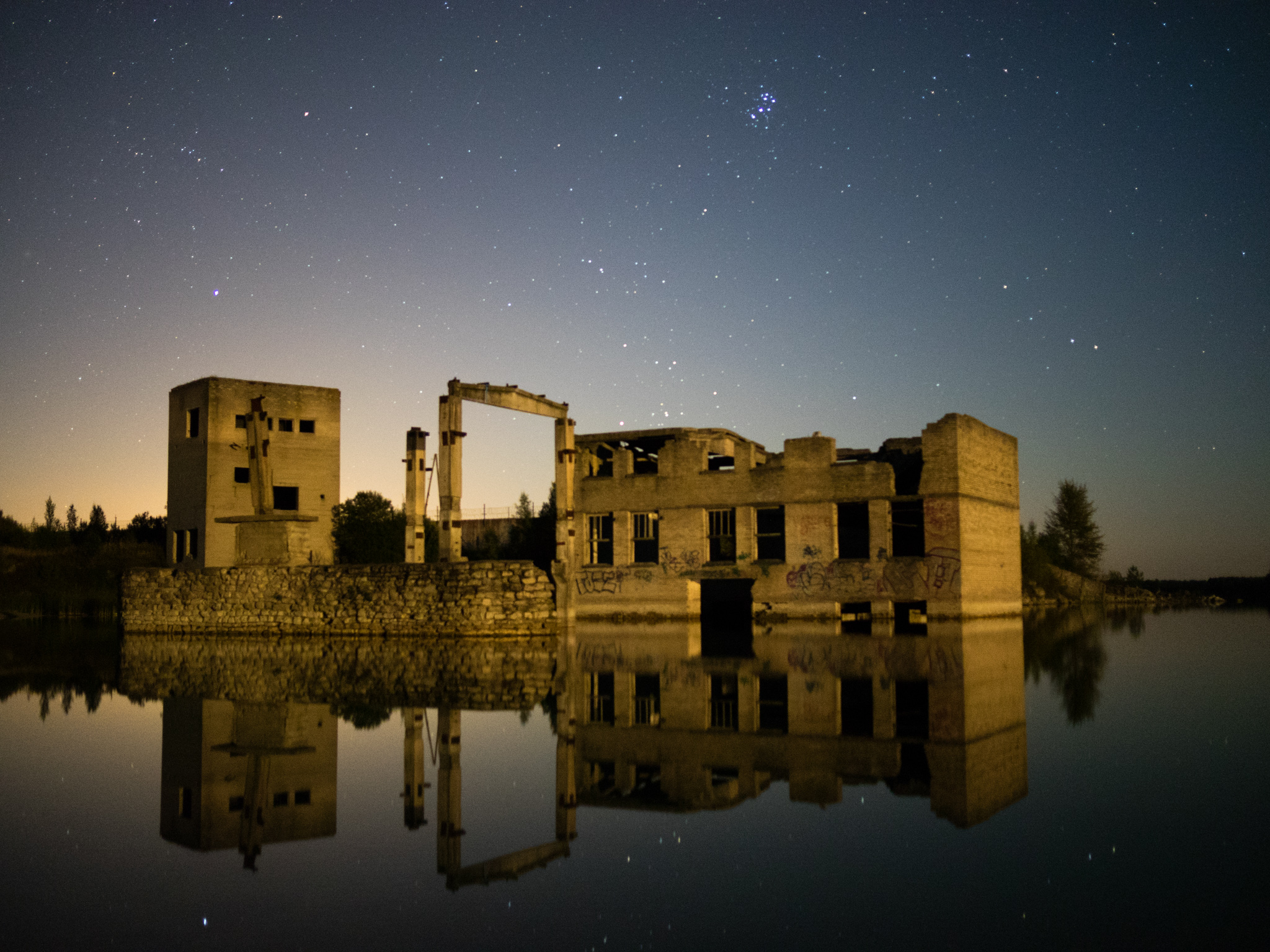
Derelict Rummu quarry utility buildings in the water at night, September 2014.

The Rummu quarry is a submerged limestone quarry located in Rummu, Vasalemma Parish, Estonia, Europe. Much of the natural area of the quarry is under a lake formed by groundwater, and is situated next to a spoil tip. The quarry is close to two former prisons, the nearest being the former Rummu prison.

== History and geography ==
In the late 1930s, the quarry began to be excavated for open mining of limestone and Vasalemma marble. The latter is a specific kind of limestone with its structure and texture resembling that of marble.

During the Soviet era, until the 1990s, excavation was performed as hard labour by Murru and Rummu prisoners, who would excavate and process limestone from the water-drained quarry.

When pumping of water ceased, the quarry quickly filled with groundwater, forming a lake, immersing some of the utility buildings and machinery. Next to the lake is the Vasalemma spoil tip (slag heap). Over time, the spoil tip assumed a unique appearance through erosion by water.

The Rummu Prison was merged with the Murru Prison in 2001, then in 2004 those were merged with the Harku women's prison. On 31 December 2012, all of these prisons closed permanently.

With the closure of the Rummu quarry, the area became a featured location for nature photography, hiking, rafting, scuba diving, as a summer spot, musical and sports events, and as a filming location for its unique layout. The site was depicted in the post-apocalyptic short film The Most Beautiful Day (2015) by Einar Kuusk (et). Several of the deserted buildings at Rummu were featured in the video for hit song "Faded" (2015) by Norwegian DJ Alan Walker and Jesse Kaikuranta's - 'Vielä täällä' also include scenes from Rummy quarry.

Since 2015, Architecture students from Estonian Academy of Arts (EKA) have been discussing ideas and drafting several possible sketches and proposals of what the abandoned area of the quarry could become in the future. In 2017, the owners of the property were planning a technology park.

== Access and safety ==
The territory is private property, and belongs to KB Auto Eesti OÜ.

The place is practically impossible to access by car, since vehicles are prohibited from stopping near the gate of the road to the quarry. Parking around the Keila–Haapsalu road was problematic during Summer periods, as roadsides were filled with parked cars, making purposeful traffic around them difficult.

Jump-diving into the lake off derelict buildings is very dangerous, and professional divers have made public recommendations against this practice, because the lake bed contains pieces of thick concrete, tree branches, rebar spikes, metal construction (including machinery), and plenty of barbed wire.

In early 2016, the area began to be closed off, because of issues with cars, and because swimming and diving into the lake is dangerous, and the owner has posted relevant warning signs. On 7 August 2014, a 17-year-old girl injured her back when jumping into the water off a derelict building. Then in July 2016, late in the day, a 35-year-old man was found drowned in the quarry.

== See also ==
- Rummu
