= Prisons in Estonia =

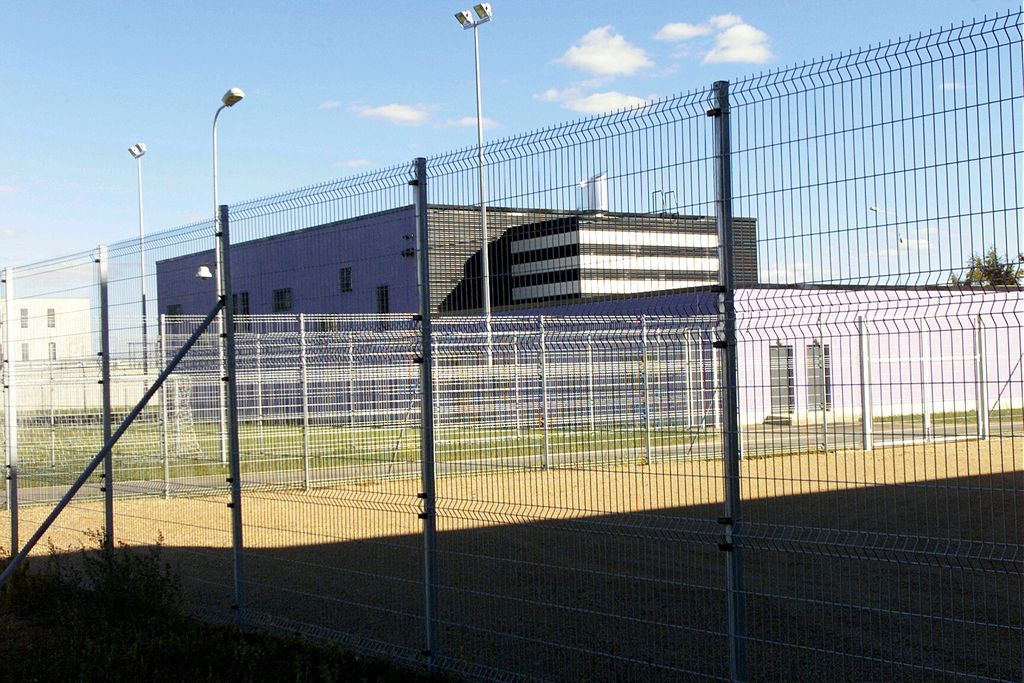
A prison in Tartu, Estonia

The prisons in Estonia are operated by the Estonian Department of Prisons, which currently maintains three prisons around the country: Tallinn Prison, Tartu Prison and Viru Prison.

== History ==
Prisons were used more frequently under the Estonian Soviet Socialist Republic, and people were held for longer periods of times. This use did not immediately fall after Estonia's independence, as it took time to reform policing and the criminal code, and crime rates grew in the meantime. Prisons were managed by the Ministry of Internal Affairs until August 1993, when they were transferred to the Ministry of Justice. A program began in 1996 to replace old Soviet prison buildings with new ones. Probation and parole were established in 1997 with the Probation Act. Tartu prison opened in 2002.

== Population ==
In March 2011, there were 3,405 persons incarcerated in Estonia, and the number of prisoners per 100,000 residents were 254, which is the third highest rate in the EU. These figures include pre-trial detainees and remand prisoners. It is, however, a much lower rate than in the late 1990s and early 2000s, when the Estonian prison population reached almost 5,000 persons.

Estonian prisoners and prison population per 100,000 inhabitants
Year	Prisoners	Prison population per 100,000 inhabitants
1992	4778	312
1993	4514	302
1994	4518	309
1995	4401	306
1996	4228	301
1997	4752	341
1998	4342	315
1999	4679	341
2000	4803	351
2001	4775	350
2002	4352	321
2003	4575	339
2004	4565	339
2005	4410	328
2006	4310	321
2007	3466	258
2008	3656	273
2009	3555	265
2010	3393	254
2011	3400	255
2012	3286	248
