= Galojan =

Galojan is a surname. Notable people with the surname include:

- Anna-Maria Galojan (born 1982), Estonian political scientist
- Lilit Galojan (born 1983), Armenian chess Grandmaster
