= Harku Prison =

Prison in Estonia

- Interactive map of Harku Prison
- Location: 59°23′17″N 24°35′19″E

Harku Prison (Estonian: Harku vangla) was an Estonian prison. The prison was located in Harku, Harju County.

The prison was established in 1926.

- In 1965, the prison was adapted to a women's prison.
- In 2011, Harku Prison was merged with Murru Prison.
- In 2016, Harku and Murru Prison merged with Tallinn Prison. Prisoners were transported to Tallinn, Tartu and Viru Prison.
