= Crushed Rock, Mpape =

Abandoned quarry in Nigeria

Coordinates: 9°08′03″N 7°29′48″E

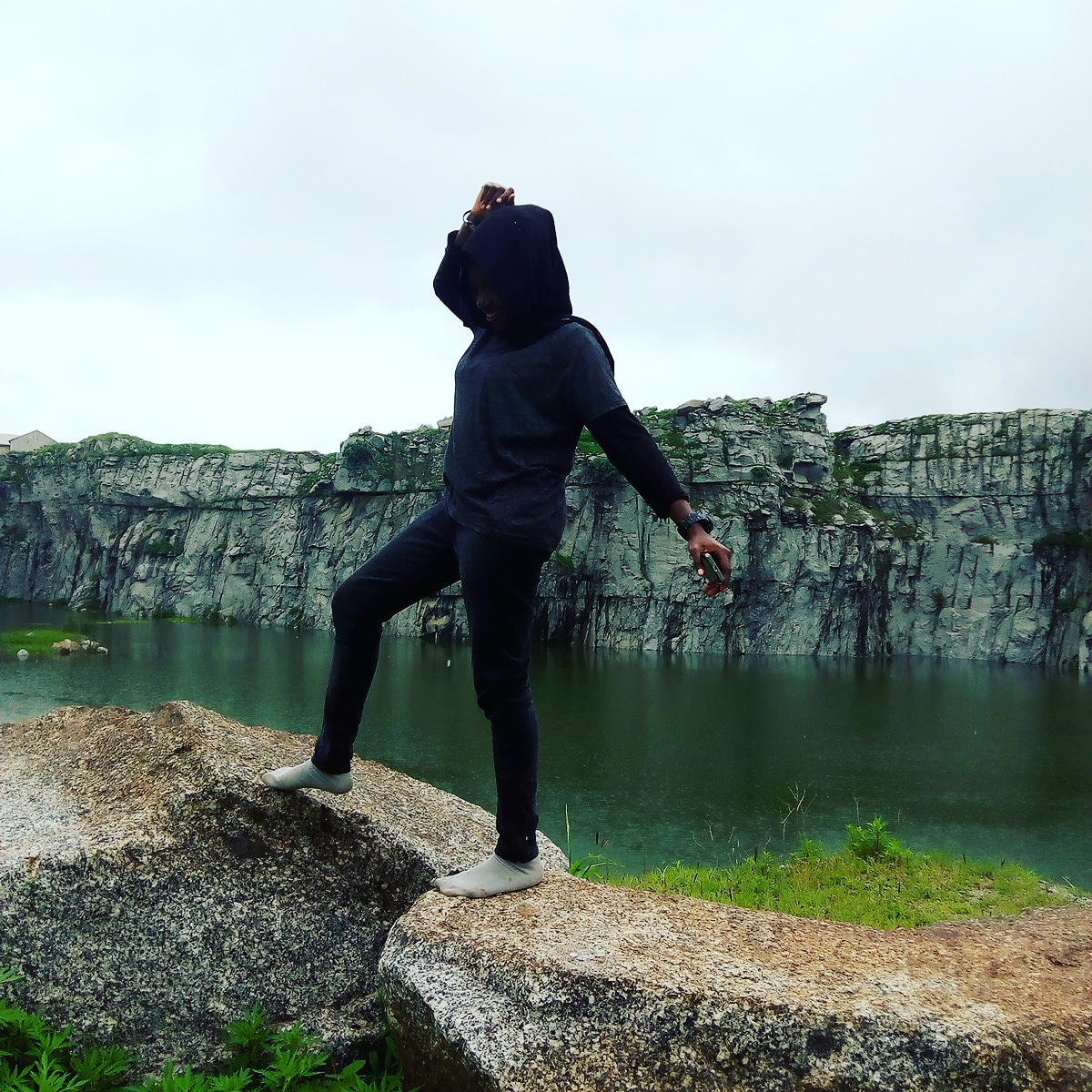
Crushed rock quarry lake at Mpape, 2018

Crushed Rock is an abandoned quarry in Mpape, Abuja, the capital of Nigeria. The quarry was opened in 1977, just a year after the decision to relocate Nigeria's capital to Abuja from Lagos. During the 1980s the quarry provided much of the stone for the construction of the new city. It has been abandoned since at least 2010. The quarry and quarry lake are now a popular tourist location.

== History ==
The quarry was operated by Crushed Rock Industries (Nigeria) Limited, which was incorporated on 13 May 1977. The quarry was created after the 1976 decision to relocate the capital of Nigeria to Abuja from Lagos. The quarry was heavily utilised during the 1980s when it, and others in Mpape, supplied much of the stone required for the construction of new buildings in the city. The quarry is in the nearby neighbourhood of Mpape (which means "rock" in the Gwari language).

== After closure ==
The quarry has been closed since at least 2010. The quarry flooded, forming a quarry lake, due to the workers striking an aquifer. The site experienced rock tremors as recently as late 2018. Some abandoned mining machinery lies within the lake.

In recent times it has become a popular location for tourists and locals in the city. The lake and high cliffs make it an attractive hiking location. A lockdown imposed in Nigeria because of the 2020 COVID-19 pandemic increased the site's popularity as people were banned from travelling to destinations farther afield. Paths lead to a high-level grassy plateau, popular for picnics, and to the edge of the quarry lake.
