= Ropka industrial district =

Neighbourhood of Tartu, Estonia

Coordinates: 58°20′44.6″N 26°43′52.46″E

Ropka tööstusrajoon
- Neighbourhood of Tartu
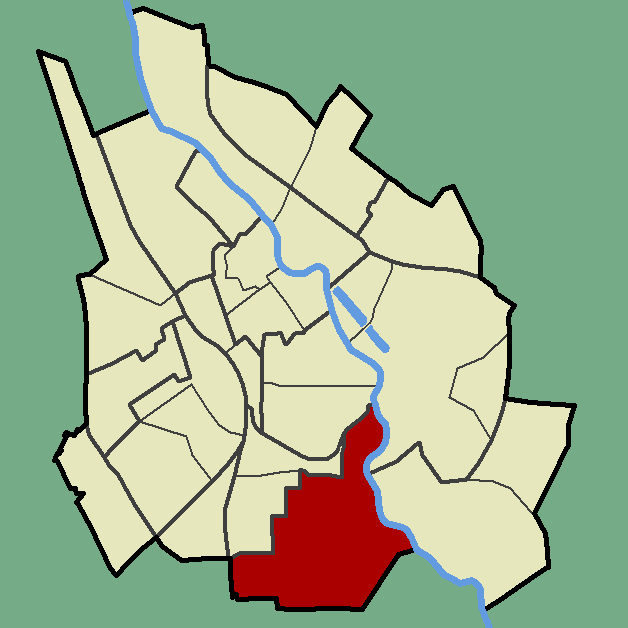
- Location of Ropka tööstusrajoon in Tartu.
- Country: Estonia
- County: Tartu County
- City: Tartu

Area
  - Total: 3.64 km^{2} (1.41 sq mi)

Population (31.12.2013)
  - Total: 2,424
  - Density: 666/km^{2} (1,720/sq mi)

The Ropka industrial district (Estonian: Ropka tööstusrajoon) is a neighbourhood of Tartu, Estonia. It has a population of 2,424 (as of 31 December 2013) and an area of 3.64 km^{2} (1.41 mi^{2}).

== See also ==
- Tartu Prison
