= Minestone =

Solid residual material resulting from the mining of coal

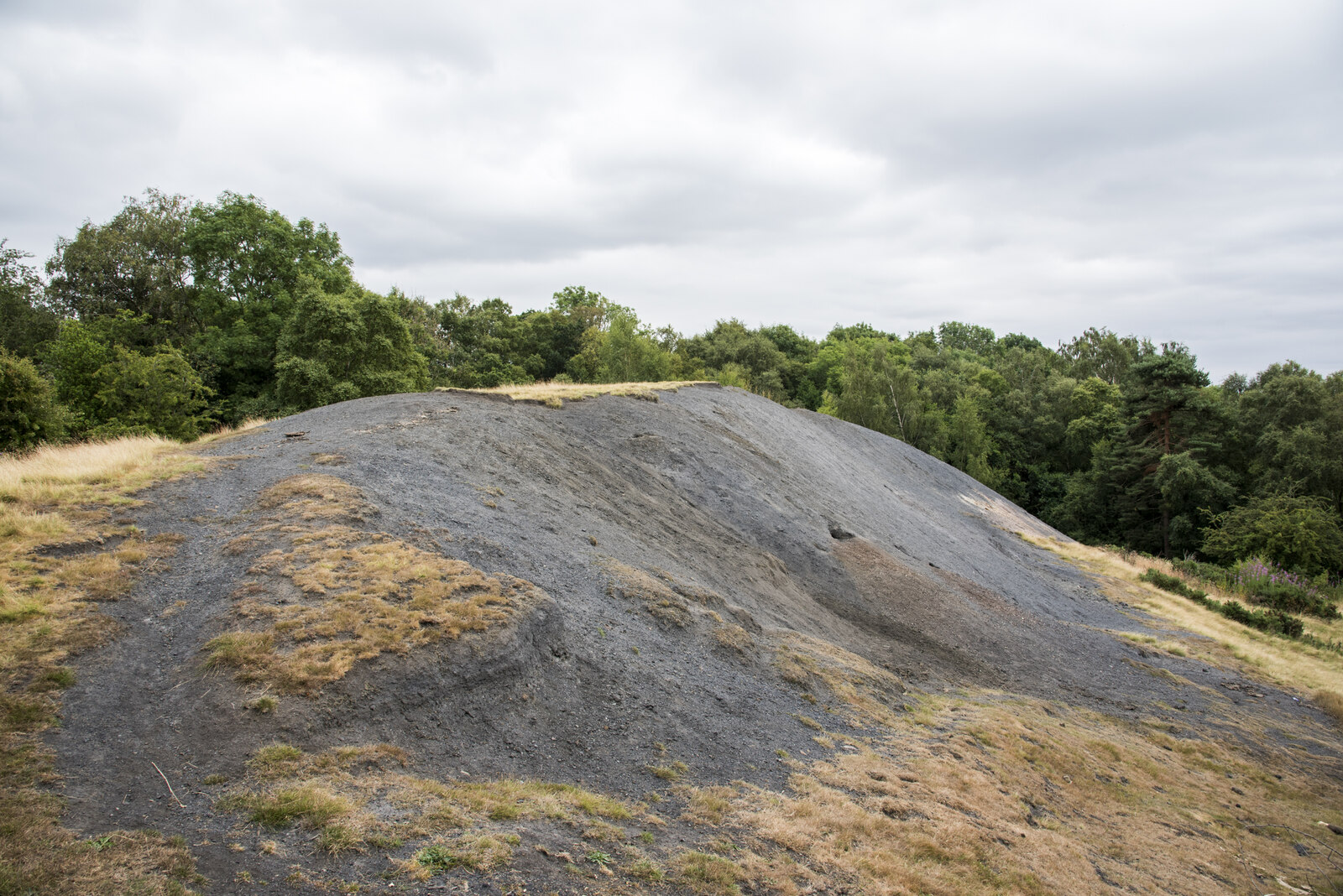
A colliery spoil heap in Butterknowle, England

Minestone, also known as colliery spoil, is the solid residual material resulting from the mining of coal. It is likely to contain varying proportions of sandstone, shale, mudstone and coal fragments. The material properties can vary considerably both within a spoil tip and from tip to tip.
