= Rummu =

Borough in Estonia

- Small borough
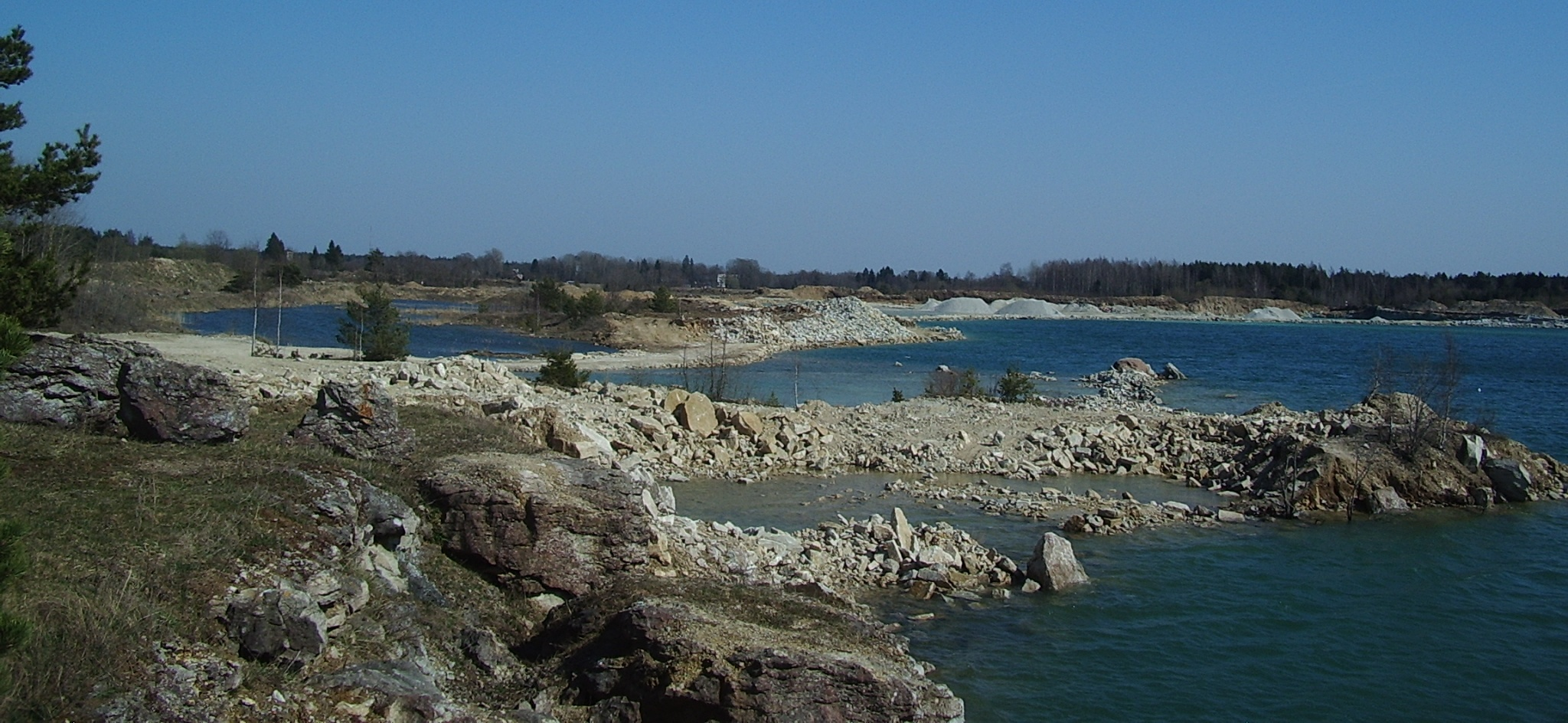
- Rummu quarry

- Location in Estonia
- Coordinates: 59°13′51″N 24°12′35″E
- Country: Estonia
- County: Harju County
- Municipality: Lääne-Harju Parish

Population (2011 Census)
  - Total: 1,088

Rummu is a small borough (Estonian: alevik) in Lääne-Harju Parish, Harju County, northern Estonia. As of the 2011 census, the settlement's population was 1,088, of whom 288 (26.5%) were Estonians.

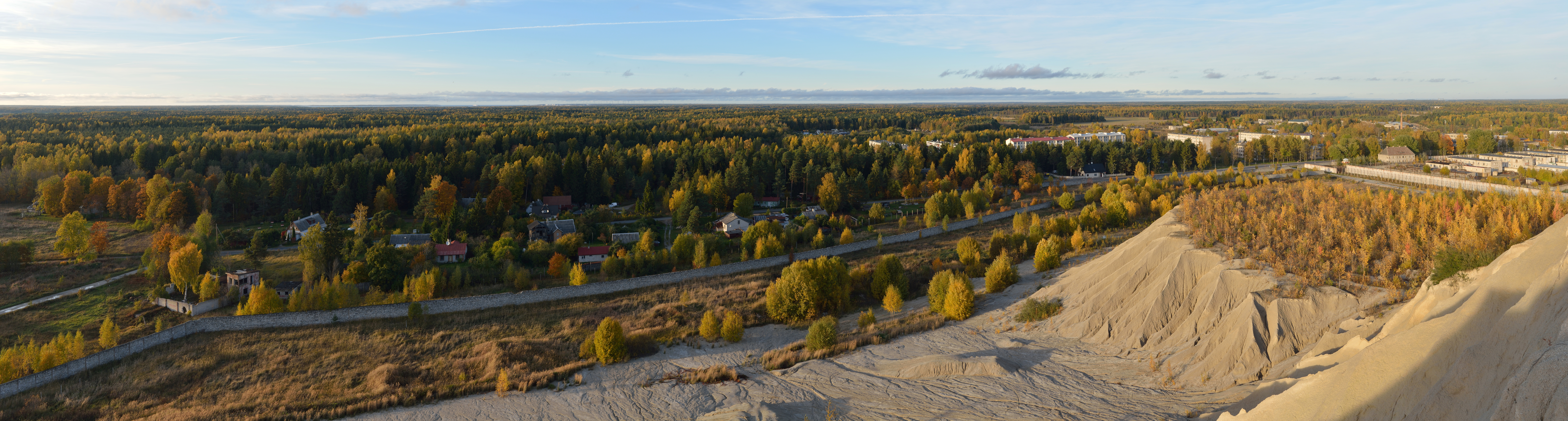
Rummu from spoil tip

== See also ==
- Rummu quarry
- Murru Prison
- Rummu Prison
