= Aleksandr Rubel =

Estonian serial killer (born 1980)

- Born: Aleksandr Andreevich Rubel; 25 December 1980 (age 45); Ukrainian SSR, Soviet Union
- Penalty: 8 years imprisonment

Details
- Victims: 6–7+
- Span of crimes: 1997–1998
- Country: Estonia
- State: Harju

Aleksandr Andreevich Rubel (born 25 December 1980) is a Ukrainian-born Estonian serial killer convicted of six murders in Tallinn, Estonia. Sentenced as a minor to the maximum punishment allowed by law (eight years of imprisonment), he was released from Tartu Prison on 8 June 2006. Although it has been speculated that Rubel currently lives in Ukraine, multiple sources have seen him back in Estonia with a changed name.

== Murders ==
Rubel, a solvent abuser, had huffed gasoline vapours before committing his crimes.

On 19 September 1997, Rubel killed Tõnu Põld (born 1952), a disabled neighbour. According to Rubel's testimony, he had the desire to kill anybody at that time, and had picked Põld as his first victim because he knew Põld could not mount a spirited defense.

On 7 November 1997, Rubel's second victim, Aleksei Pavlov, was first stabbed four times by Rubel's father Andrei Rubel. According to his testimony, Pavlov had been a guest of the Rubel's and Andrei Rubel had believed Pavlov had been courting his wife.

Pursuant to the stabbing, Aleksandr Rubel helped Pavlov into an empty room within the house, where he strangled him and threw him out the third-floor window.

Andrei Rubel was convicted as an accessory in this murder and sentenced to seven years imprisonment.

Between 22 and 24 January 1998, Rubel stabbed Jevgeni Shelest (born 1947) to death at Stroomi Beach.

On 2 February 1998, Rubel decapitated Vladimir Ivanov (born 1954), a random passerby.

Rubel dispatched and decapitated Ivanov using an axe after asking him for a cigarette and five EEK "for gasoline".

On 9 February 1998, Rubel killed Olga Voronkova (born 1944), a neighbour tenant in the tenement house in which the Rubel resided in Kopli (Kopli 100B).

Between 28 February and 1 March 1998, Rubel killed Vladimir Kinzerski (born 1944) in his house.

On 4 June 1998, Rubel killed 15-year-old Alice Siivas (born 22 February 1983) in Paljassaare by slitting her throat.

== See also ==
- List of serial killers by country

== Sources ==
- Postimees 11 February 1999: Sarimõrvar nautis verd ja surma by Tiiu Põld
- Postimees 16 February 1999: Sarimõrtsukas jäi süüdi seitsme inimese tapmises by Tiiu Põld
- SL Õhtuleht 5 April 2006: Kopli sarimõrvar pääseb vabadusse
- Postimees 7 June 2006: Sarimõrvar Rubel vabaneb homme vanglast
- SL Õhtuleht 9 June 2006: Kas tapakirg on taltunud?
