= Anna-Maria Galojan =

Estonian politician and model

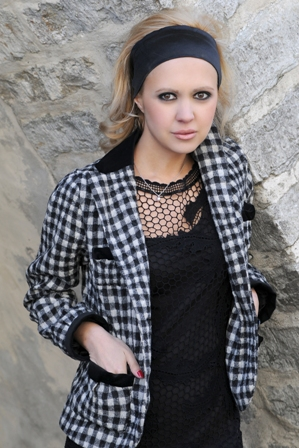
- Born: 23 February 1982 (age 44); Kohtla-Järve, then part of Estonian SSR, Soviet Union

Anna-Maria Galojan (born 23 February 1982) is an Estonian former politician, model, and ex-convict. In May 2011, Galojan was convicted of embezzlement for which she was sentenced to 22 months in prison. She first became known in Estonia with her self-funded ad campaign during the 2007 Parliamentary elections running for Estonian Reform Party. She was not elected. With only 462 votes she came seventh of Reform Party in her electoral district where the party clinched two mandates. Though the campaign was unsuccessful her TV ads featuring archery became memes and brought her fame. She appeared on the cover of Estonian Playboy, became cover girl for Belgian chocolate maker Xocai.

In May 2011, Galojan was convicted for document forgery and embezzlement of €60,000 from the non-profit organization European Movement Estonia, of which she was the CEO. She was sentenced to 22 months imprisonment of which five months was real jail time and the rest conditional with a probationary period of four years. She fled to London where she was arrested on 14 February 2012. After several years of legal battles she was eventually extradited in February 2015 and transferred to Tallinn Prison.
