= Quarry lake =

Lake that is formed after a quarry has been dug

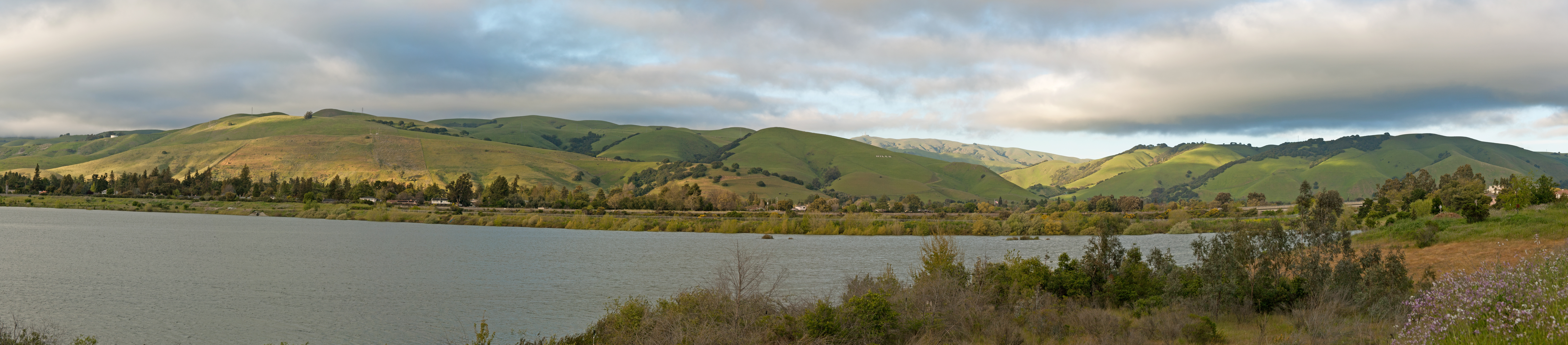
Quarry Lake in Fremont, California

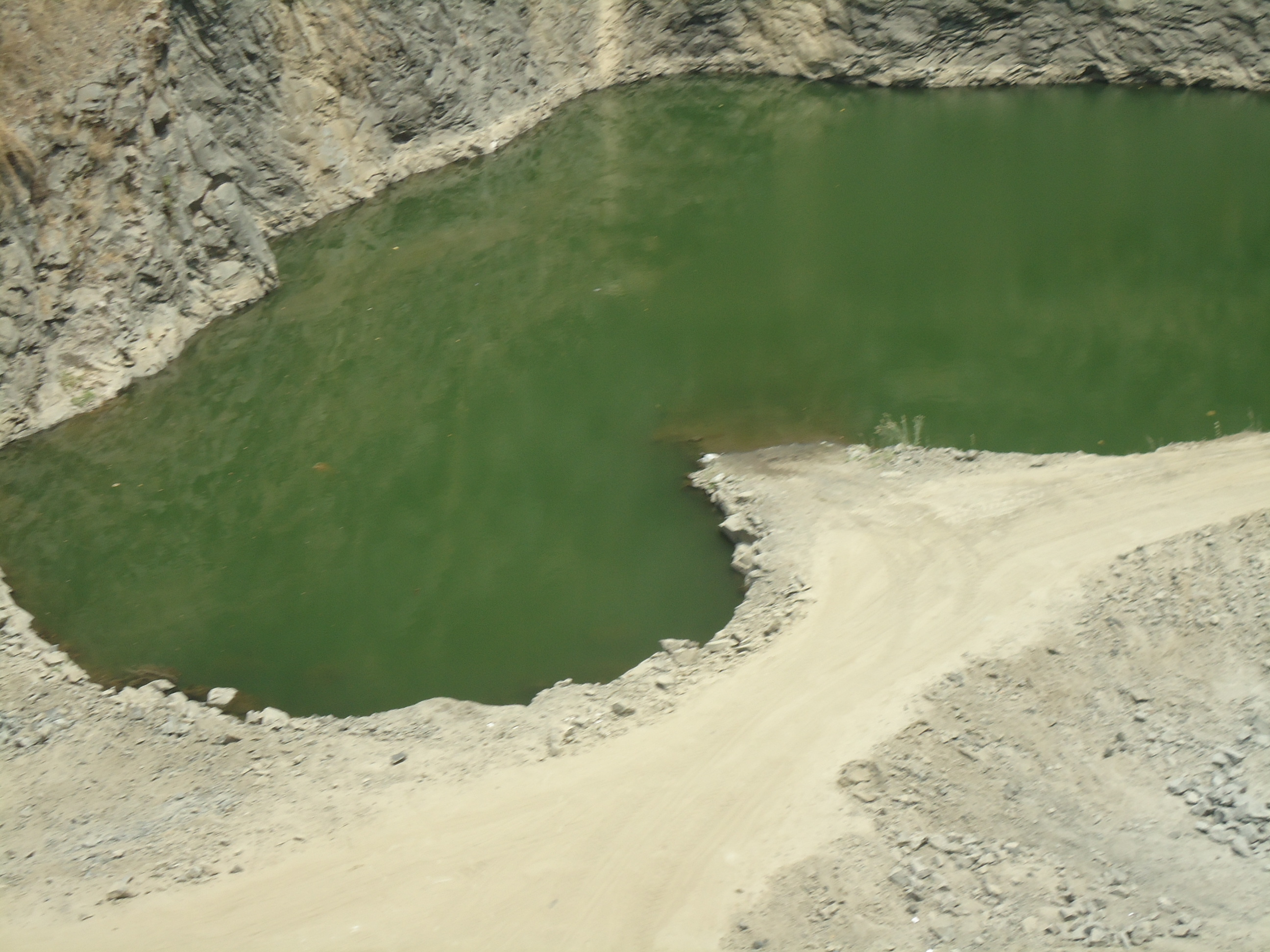
A quarry lake in an abandoned stone quarry in Kerala, India

A quarry lake, also known as a pit lake, is a lake that is formed after a quarry has been dug through a mining operation.

== Formation ==
During the mining process, water must be emptied. But after the mining operation has been abandoned, groundwater is allowed to seep in, and rainwater collects in the quarry. Sometimes, the quarry will be artificially filled with water. The depth of a quarry lake is dependent upon rainfall in the region.

== Physical characteristics ==
The surface area, depth, and shape of these lakes can vary. However, they tend to have a greater relative depth than natural lakes, with natural lakes typically being less than 2% and quarry lakes typically being between 10-40%, meaning that they tend to be deep relative to their surface area.

=== Limnology ===
Most natural lakes are holomictic, meaning the water in them mixes completely top-to-bottom at least once per year. However, quarry lakes are mostly meromictic, meaning the lake does not fully mix, leading to stratification.

== Hazards to humans ==
Water-filled quarries can be very deep, often 50 ft (15 m) or more, and surprisingly cold, so swimming in quarry lakes is generally not recommended. Unexpectedly cold water can cause a swimmer's muscles to suddenly weaken; it can also cause shock, cold water shock and even hypothermia. Though quarry water is often very clear, submerged quarry stones and abandoned equipment make diving and jumping into these quarries extremely dangerous. Several people drown in quarries each year. Water-filled quarries can have dangerous electric currents in them that can be deadly under water.

Geology.com cites Mine Safety and Health Administration data in saying that between 2001 and 2017, there were 201 drowning deaths in abandoned mines in the United States, or around twelve per year; statistics from the Centers for Disease Control indicate that each year there are 3,960 drowning deaths.

== Ecology ==
Quarry lakes, even lakes within active quarries, can provide important habitats for animals.

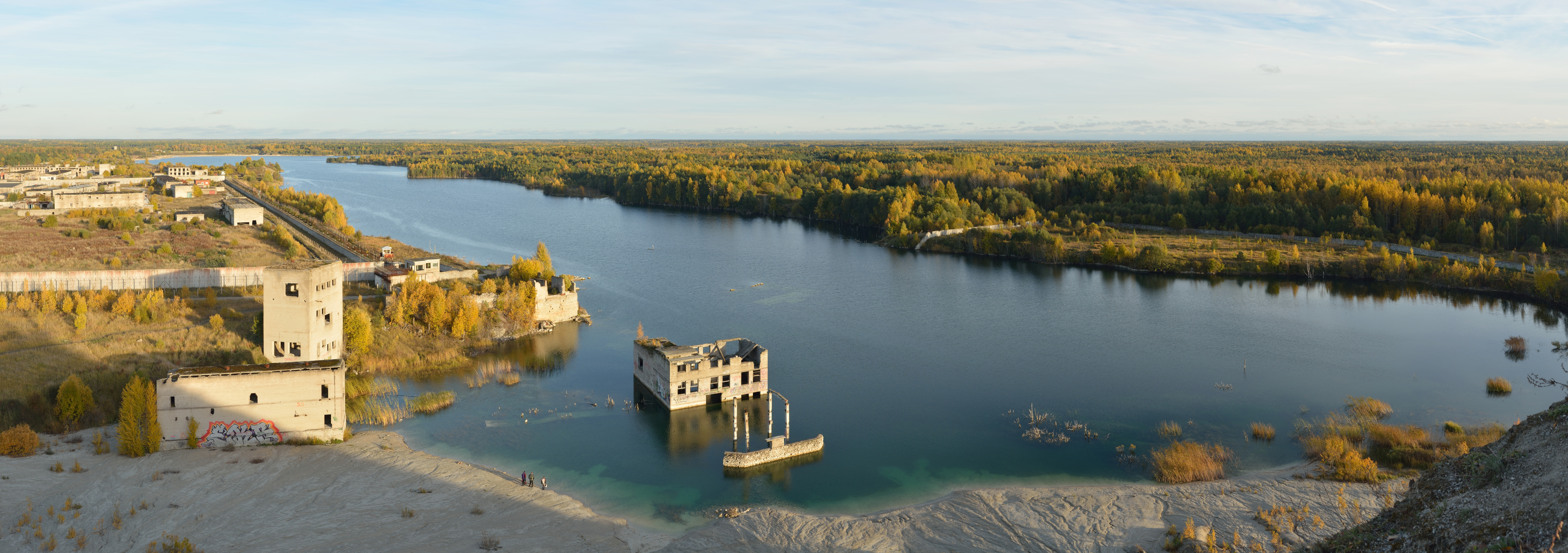
An abandoned limestone quarry in Rummu, Estonia.

== By country ==
=== Switzerland ===
In Switzerland, quarry lakes have been prohibited since the 1990s, contrasting sharply with the widespread acceptance of such recreational facilities in neighboring Germany and France. The prohibition stems from strict groundwater protection regulations designed to safeguard the country's drinking water supply.

Swiss regulations require maintaining a "dry protective layer" of several meters of gravel above the maximum possible groundwater level. This prevents direct contact between surface water and groundwater, which occurs naturally in quarry lakes elsewhere. This approach prioritizes groundwater protection due to concerns about contamination from recreational activities. Potential pollutants include sunscreen chemicals from swimmers and human waste, which could infiltrate the groundwater system. Groundwater contamination is often irreversible, making rehabilitation extremely difficult once pollution occurs.

Rather than creating quarry lakes, exhausted Swiss gravel pits are typically restored to their original state as agricultural land or forests. Some areas are converted into artificial wetlands that serve as habitats for protected species such as the yellow-bellied toad (Bombina variegata) and other wildlife.

Despite the general prohibition, some artificial swimming lakes do exist. The lake at Kriessern in the Rhine Valley of Canton of St. Gallen was created after gravel extraction in the 1920s, predating the current regulations. Similarly, Geschinersee in the Conches Valley of Canton of Valais was constructed in 2003, but it is fed by a stream rather than groundwater.
