= Dragomir Milošević =

Bosnian Serb military commander

Dragomir Milošević (Serbian Cyrillic: Драгомир Милошевић; born 4 February 1942) is a Bosnian Serb and former commander of the Sarajevo-Romanija Corps (SRK) of the Army of Republika Srpska (VRS) which besieged Sarajevo for three years during the Bosnian War. He was subsequently convicted of war crimes and sentenced to 29 years in prison.

== Background ==
Milošević was an officer in the Yugoslav People's Army (JNA) prior to 1992. The JNA posted Milošević to Lukavica, near Sarajevo which is where he was when the war began. He succeeded Stanislav Galić as commander of the SRK on 10 August 1994 and remained in that position until the end of the war.

In December 2004, he surrendered to the U.N. International Criminal Tribunal for the Former Yugoslavia (ICTY), before which he faced charges for four counts of crimes against humanity and three counts of violations of the laws or customs of war.

== ICTY conviction ==
On 12 December 2007, Milošević was convicted on five counts of terror, murder and inhumane acts conducted during a campaign of sniping and shelling which resulted in the injury and death of a great number of civilians in the besieged Bosnian capital. Two counts of unlawful attacks against civilians were dismissed. He was sentenced to 33 years of imprisonment. In the judgment summary, the Trial Chamber noted that many witnesses testified that *there was no safe place in Sarajevo; one could be killed or injured anywhere and anytime". Milošević had "abused his position and that he, through his orders, planned and ordered gross and systematic violations of international humanitarian law" and it was under Milošević's command of the SRK that modified air bombs, which were "inaccurate and served no military purpose", were deployed. The repeated use of the weapon was considered an aggravating factor by the Trial Chamber in reaching its decision.

In January 2008, the prosecution filed an appeal to have the 33-year sentence increased to life in prison. In its appeal, the prosecution cited the use of particularly savage weapons and tactics against civilians in Sarajevo by the SRK while Milošević was in command. On 12 November 2009, the Tribunal Appeals Chamber partially affirmed the convictions and reduced the sentence to 29 years.

On 22 March 2011, Milošević was transported to Estonia to serve his sentence at Tartu Vangla.
