= Lemmaru =

Village in Estonia

Coordinates: 59°14′N 24°14′E

- Village
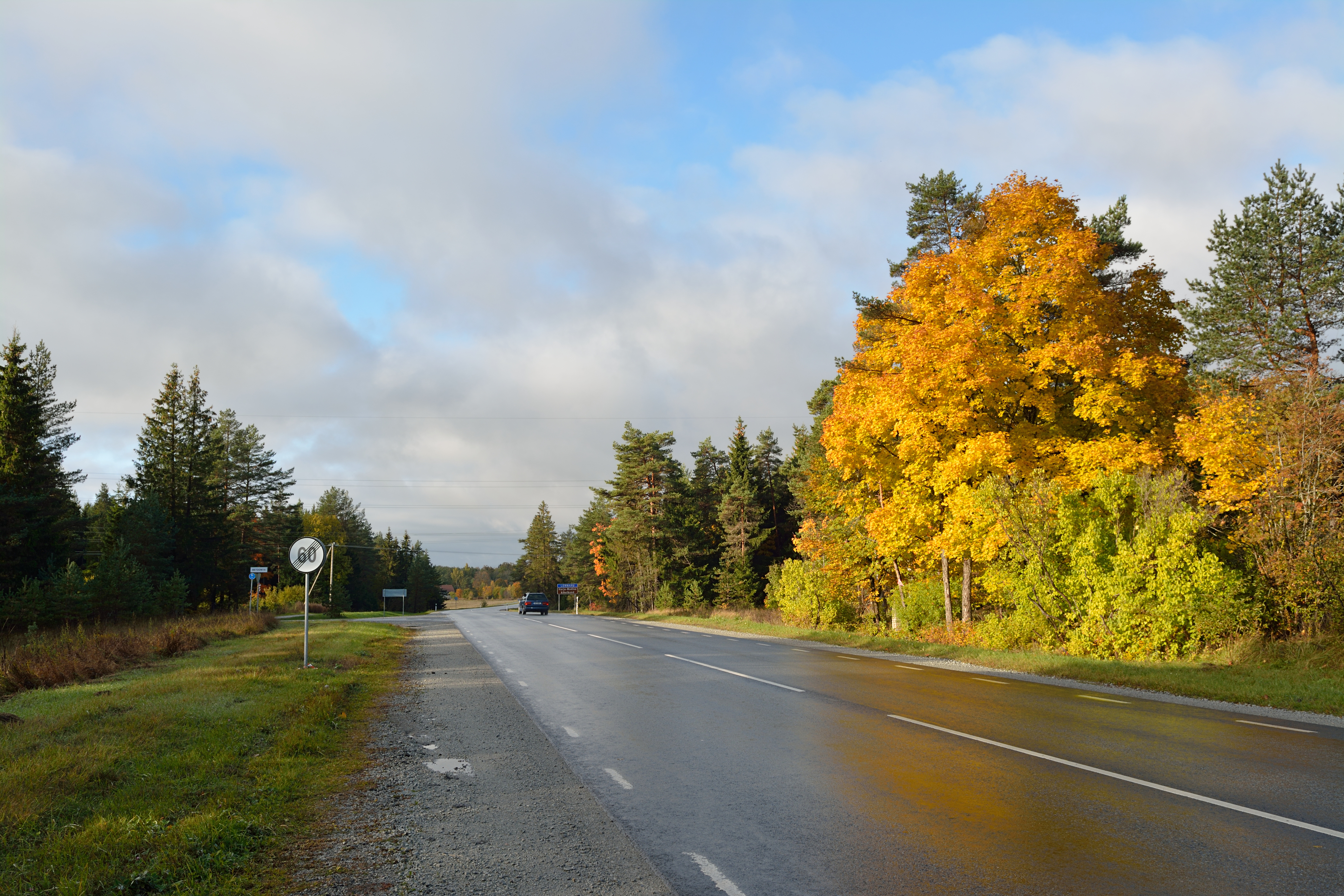
- The Keila-Haapsalu road in Lemmaru
- Interactive map of Lemmaru
- Country: Estonia
- County: Harju County
- Parish: Lääne-Harju Parish
- Time zone: UTC+2 (EET)
  - Summer (DST): UTC+3 (EEST)

Lemmaru is a village in Lääne-Harju Parish, Harju County in northern Estonia.
