= Murru Prison =

Prison in Estonia

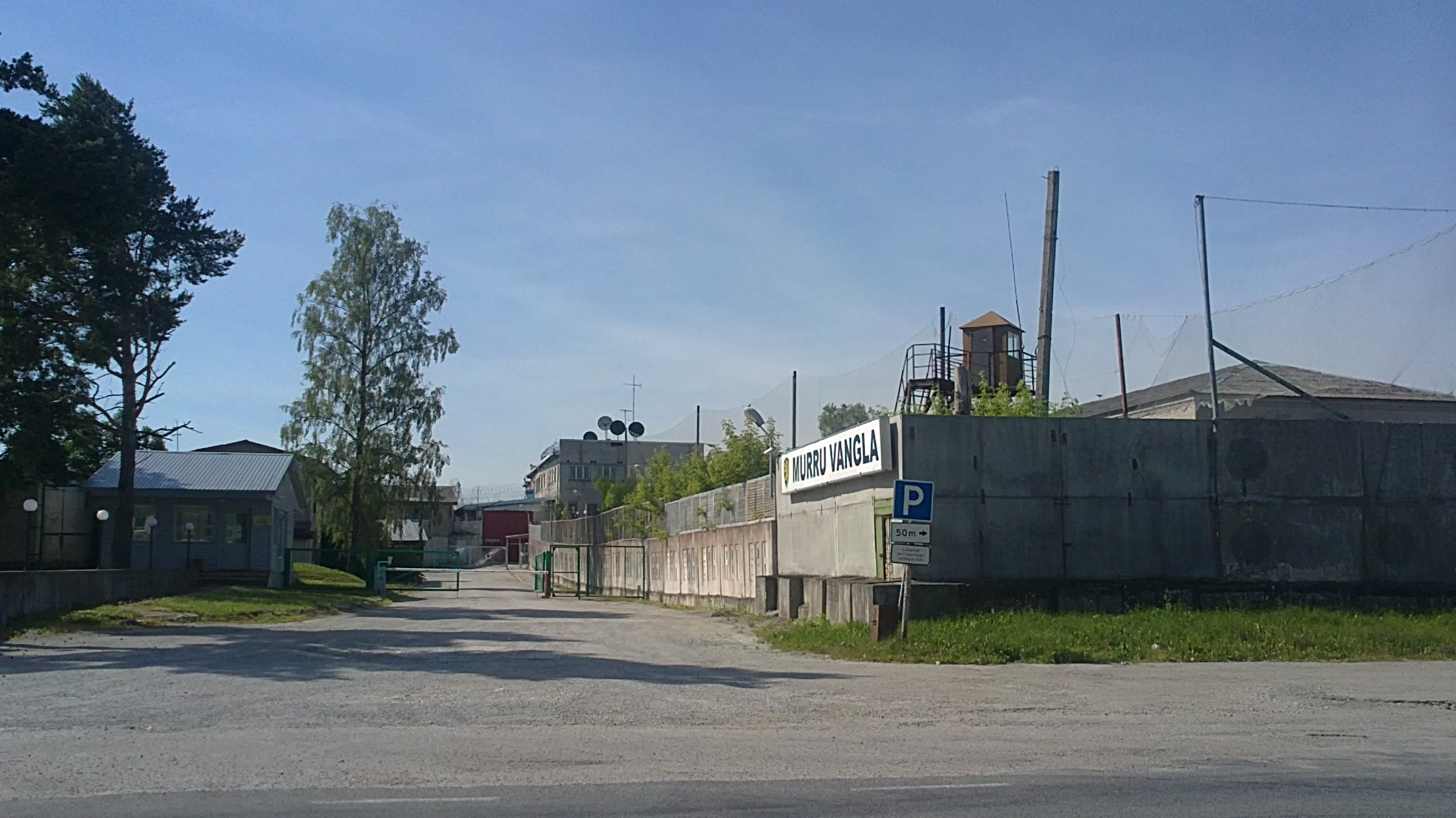
- Murru Prison
- Interactive map of Murru Prison
- Location: 59°13′45″N 24°12′13″E

Murru Prison (Estonian: Murru vangla) was a prison located in Rummu, Harju County, in Northern Estonia.

The prison was established in 1938. Until the 1970s, at the prison there operated stone industry. Industry's workers were mainly prisoners.

In 1961, part of Murru prison was changed to an autonomous prison called Rummu Prison. Rummu Prison existed until 2000.

2011 Harku Prison was merged to Murru Prison (Harku and Murru Prison).

2016 Harku and Murru Prison was merged to Tallinn Prison. Prisoners were transported to Tallinn, Tartu and Viru Prison.
