= Tallinn Prison =

Prison Tallinn, Estonia

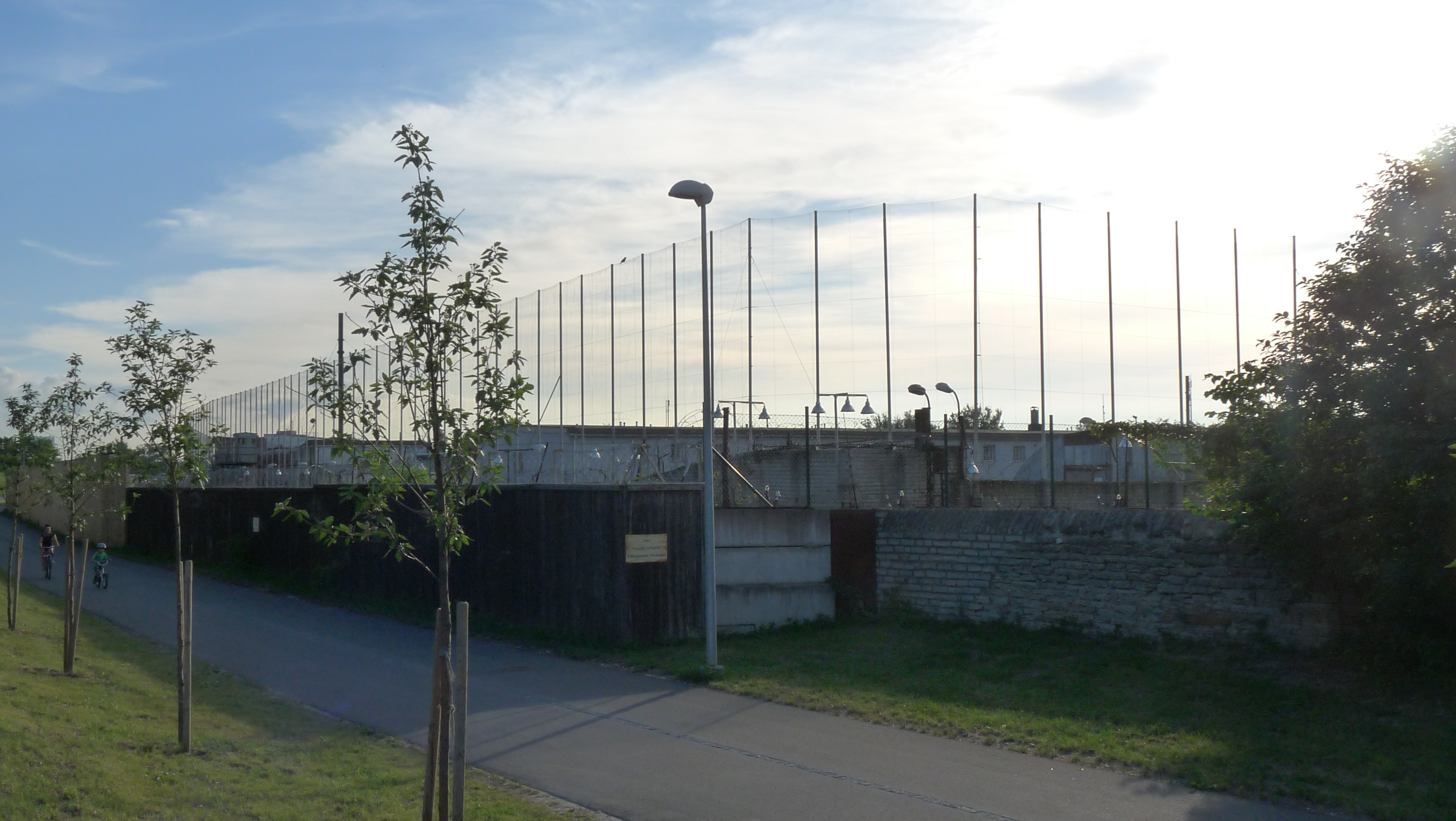
- Fence of Tallinn prison
- Interactive map of Tallinn Prison
- Location: Linnaaru tee 5, Soodevahe küla, Rae vald, 75322 Harju maakond, Estonia; 59°25′24″N 24°54′17″E

Tallinn Prison (Estonian: Tallinna vangla) is an Estonian prison, which is located at Soodevahe, Rae Parish, Harju County. Previously the prison was located at Magasini Street, Tallinn.

The history of Tallinn Prison began in 1919 when Patarei Sea Fortress was transformed into a prison (Patarei Prison). In 2000, Patarei Prison became obsolete. Patarei Prison as an institution was moved to a facility on Magasini Street.

In 2004, Maardu Prison merged with Tallinn Prison.

In 2016, Harku Prison merged with Tallinn Prison.
