= Spoil tip =

Pile built of accumulated spoil

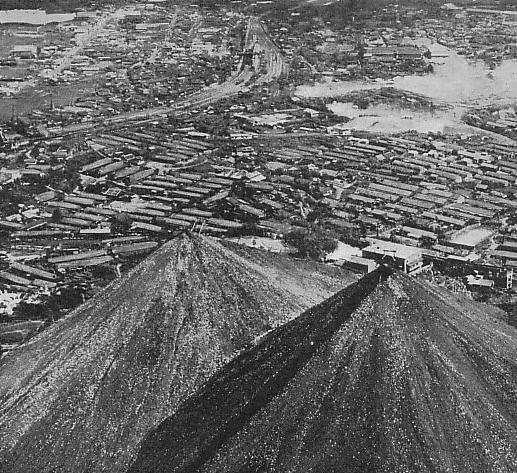
Botayama (spoil tip) in Iizuka City, Japan, in the 1950s

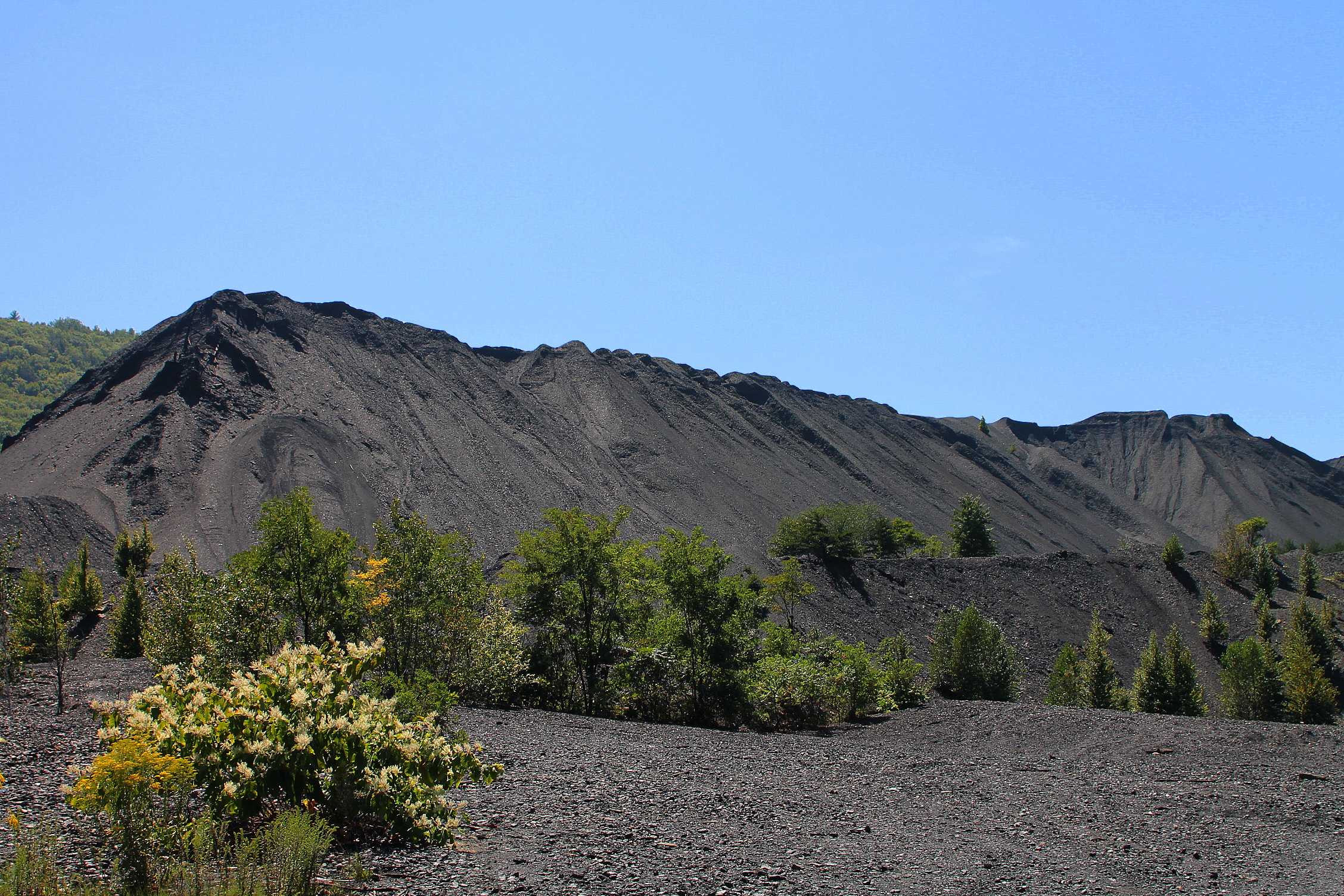
Spoil pile in Northumberland County, Pennsylvania, United States

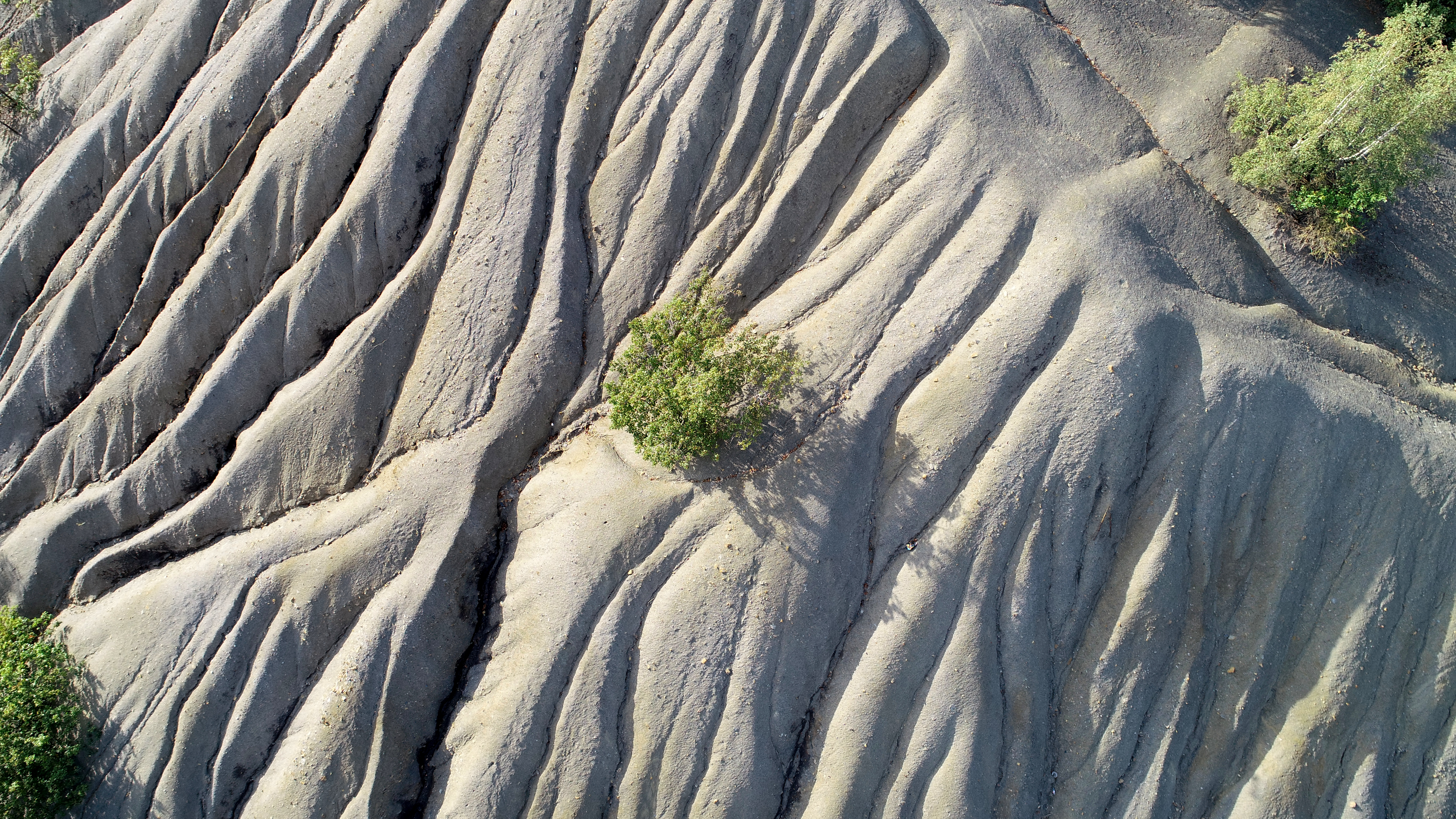
Spoil tip at Jägersfreude, Saarbrücken

A spoil tip (also called a boney pile, culm bank, gob pile, waste tip or bing) is a pile built of accumulated spoil – waste material removed during mining. Spoil tips are not formed of slag, but in some areas, such as England and Wales, they are referred to as slag heaps and sometimes as pit heaps. In Scotland the word bing is used. In North American English the term is mine dump or mine waste dump.

The term "spoil" is also used to refer to material removed when digging a foundation, tunnel, or other large excavation. Such material may be ordinary soil and rocks (after separation of coal from waste), or may be heavily contaminated with chemical waste, determining how it may be disposed of. Clean spoil may be used for land reclamation.

Spoil is distinct from tailings, which is the processed material that remains after the valuable components have been extracted from ore.

== Etymology ==
The phrase originates from the French word espoilelier, a verb meaning "to seize by violence, to plunder, to take by force".

== Physical description ==
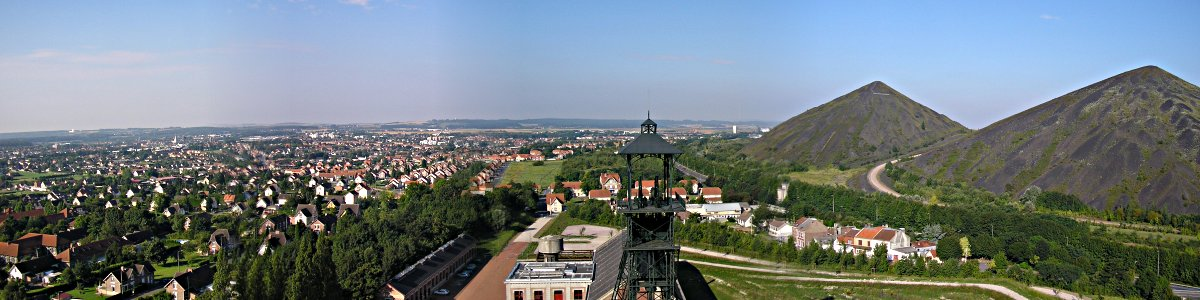
Spoil tips on the site Écopôle 11/19 in Loos-en-Gohelle (right). The town of Liévin is on the left (picture taken in 2005).

Spoil tips may be conical in shape, and can appear as conspicuous features of the landscape, or they may be much flatter and eroded, especially if vegetation has established itself. In Loos-en-Gohelle, in the former mining area of Pas-de-Calais, France, are a series of five cones, of which two rise 100 metres (330 ft) from the plain.

== Origins ==
Most commonly the term is used for the piles of waste earth materials removed during an excavation process.

- In surface mining (commonly called strip mining) for coal or other underground deposits, earth materials removed to expose the targeted deposit are piled up alongside the excavation site (commonly a strip mining pit) in spoil banks.
- A dredge in placer mining is used to dig up volumes of gravel and other earth materials, which are sent through sluices to remove gold or other minerals, and the remaining earth materials ("tailings") are deposited behind the dredge in spoil banks.
- In hydraulic mining, high-pressure jets of water dislodge earth materials, which are put through sluices to sort out gold or other minerals, and the residual earth materials are left in spoil banks.
- The excavation of ditches and canals results in spoil banks being left along the side of the canal or ditch.

Spoil banks can also refer to refuse heaps formed from removal of excess surface materials. For example, alongside livestock lots, spoil banks are formed of manure and other slurry periodically removed from the surface of the livestock lot areas.

== Environmental effects ==
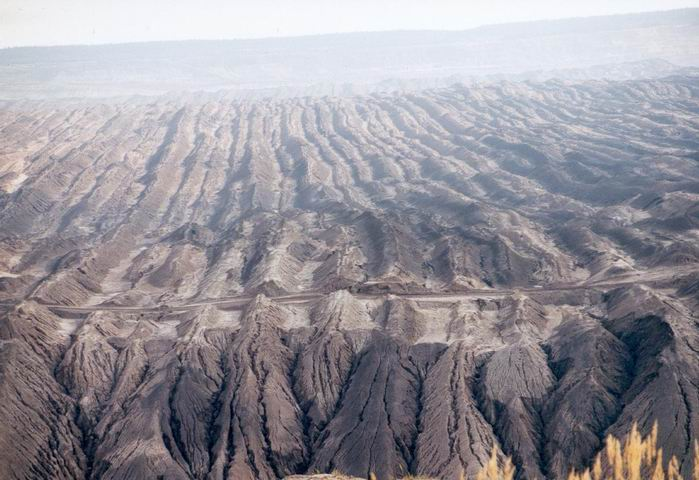
Erosion clearly visible in the overburden resulting from strip mining in Großräschen, Germany

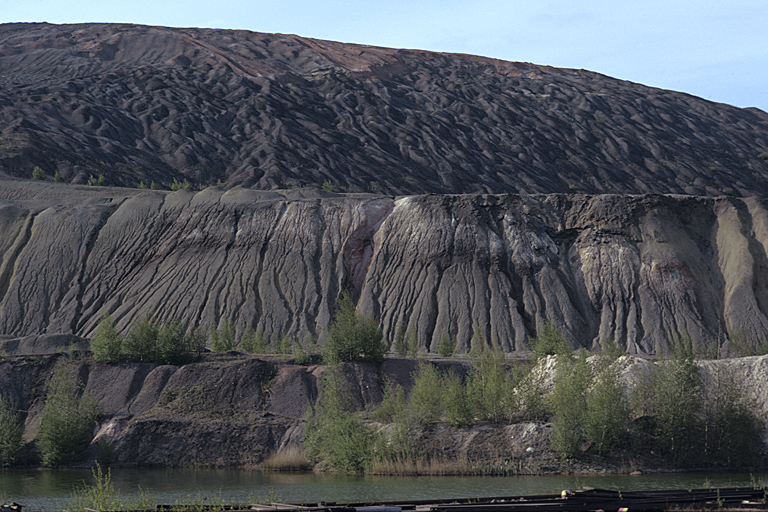
Erosion clearly visible in this spoil tip called Kvarntorpshögen, in Kvarntorp, Närke, Sweden, in the 1970s

Spoil tips sometimes increased to millions of tons, and, having been abandoned, remain as huge piles today. They trap solar heat, making it difficult (although not impossible) for vegetation to take root; this encourages erosion and creates dangerous, unstable slopes. Existing techniques for regreening spoil tips include the use of geotextiles to control erosion as the site is resoiled and simple vegetation such as grass is seeded on the slope.

The piles also create acid rock drainage, which pollutes streams and rivers. Environmental problems have included surface runoff of silt, and leaching of noxious chemical compounds from spoil banks exposed to weathering. These cause contamination of ground water, and other problems.

In the United States, current state and federal coal mining regulations require that the earth materials from excavations be removed in such a fashion that they can be replaced after the mining operations cease in a process called mine reclamation, with oversight of mining corporations. This requires adequate reserves of monetary bonds to guarantee a completion of the reclamation process when mining becomes unprofitable or stops. (See for example, the Surface Mining Control and Reclamation Act of 1977.)

=== Subterranean combustion ===
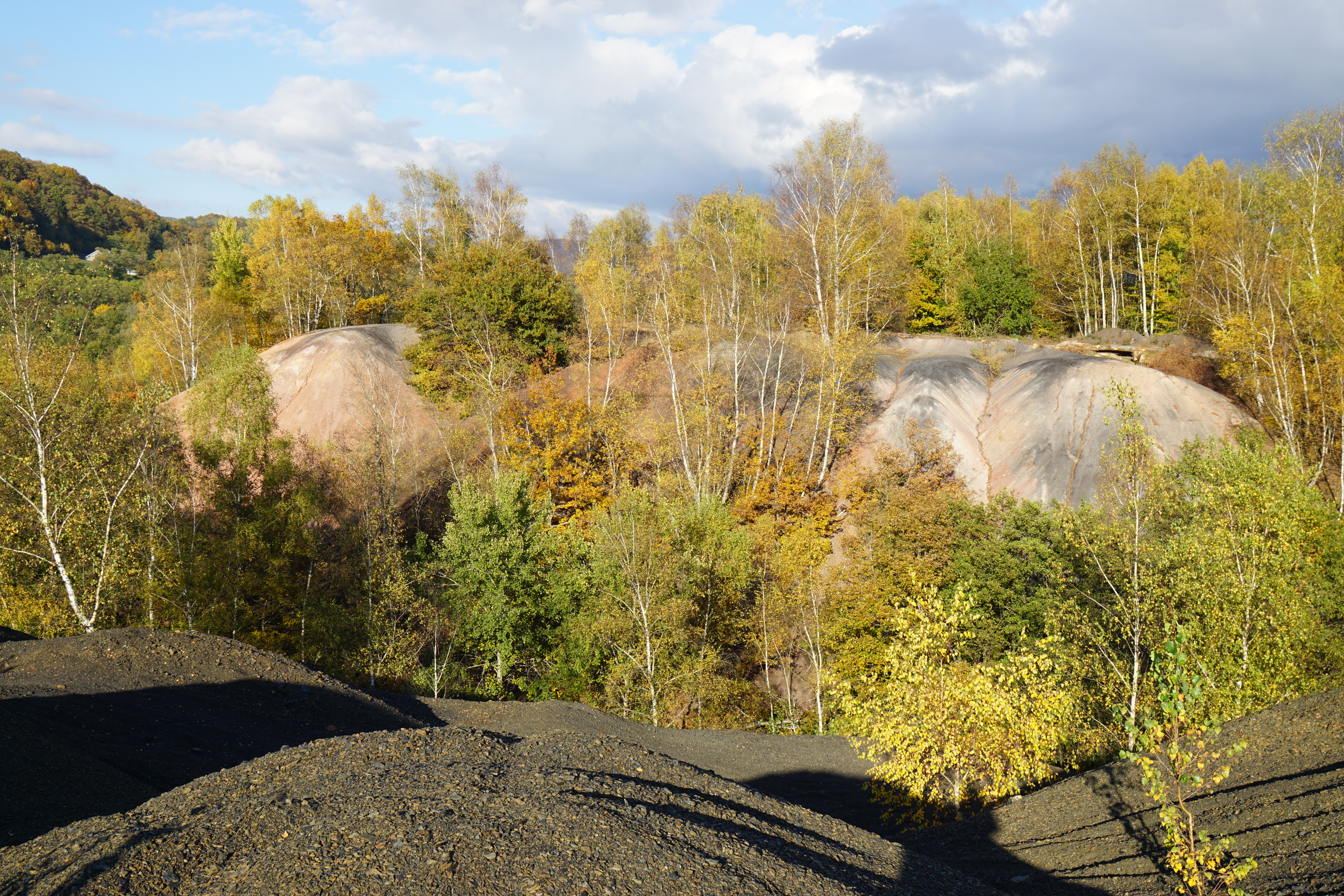
Spoil tip at the Ronchamp coal mines is colored red due to combustion

In some spoil tips, the waste resulting from industries such as coal or oil shale production can contain a relatively high proportion of hydrocarbons or coal dust. Spontaneous subterranean combustion may result, which can be followed by surface fires. In some coal mining districts, such fires were considered normal and no attempt was made to extinguish them.

Such fires can follow slow combustion of residual hydrocarbons. Their extinction can require complete encasement, which can prove impossible for technical and financial reasons. Sprinkling is generally ineffective and injecting water under pressure counter-productive, because it carries oxygen, bringing the risk of explosion.

The perceived weak environmental and public health effects of these fires leads generally to waiting for their natural extinction, which can take a number of decades.

=== Landslides ===
In October 1966, a spoil tip at Aberfan in Glamorgan, Wales, gave way, killing 144 people, 116 of them children. The tip was built over a spring, increasing its instability, and its height exceeded guidelines. Water from heavy rainfall had built up inside the tip, weakening the structure, until it suddenly collapsed onto a school below.

The wider issue of stability had been known about prior to the Aberfan disaster; for example, it was discussed in a paper by Professor George Knox in 1927, but received little serious consideration by professional engineers and geologists — even to those directly concerned with mining. Also the Aberfan disaster was not the first landslide with casualties: for example, in 1955 the two successive landslides of the Abe Mining spoil heap collapse killed 73 people in Sasebo, Nagasaki in Japan.

In February 2013, a spoil tip landslip caused the temporary closure of the Scunthorpe to Doncaster railway line in England.

Landslides are rare in spoil tips after settling and vegetation growth act to stabilise the spoil. However, when heavy rain falls on spoil tips that are undergoing combustion, infiltrated water changes to steam; increasing pressure that may lead to a landslide. In Herstal, Belgium, a landslide on the Petite Bacnure spoil tip in April 1999 closed off a street for many years.

== Re-use ==
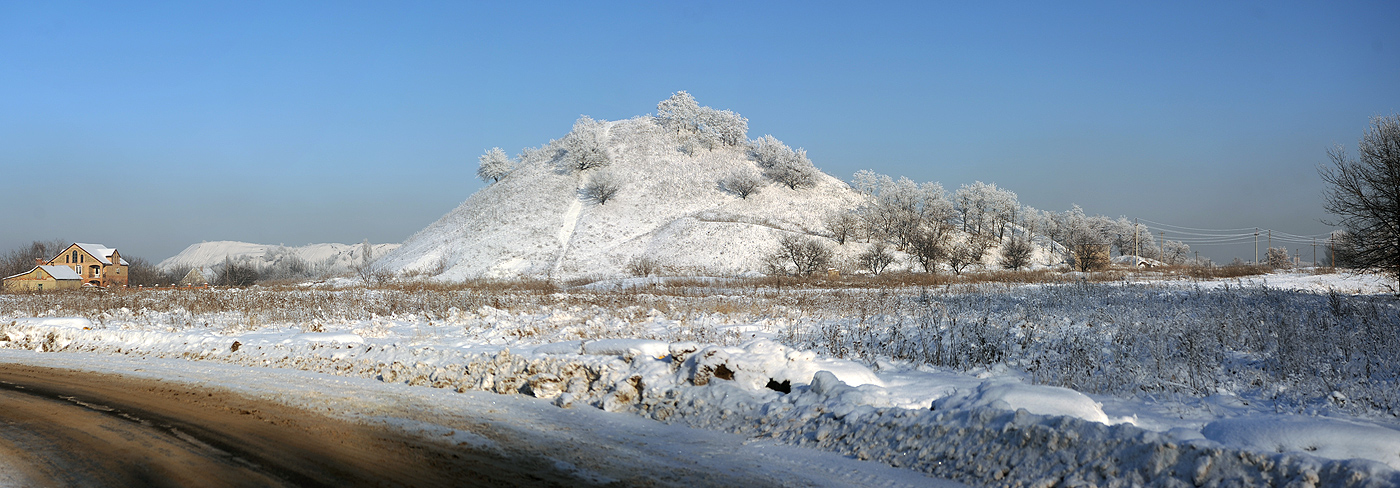
Spoil tips in winter in Donetsk, Ukraine. Nature is reclaiming the spoil tip in the foreground.

Several techniques of re-utilising the spoil tips exist, usually including either geotechnics or recycling. Most commonly, old spoil tips are partially revegetated to provide valuable green spaces since they are inappropriate for building purposes. At Nœux-les-Mines, an artificial ski slope has been constructed on the tip. If spoil tips are considered to contain sufficient amounts of residual material, various methods are employed to remove the spoil from the site for subsequent processing.

The oldest coal-based spoil tips may still contain enough coal to begin spontaneous slow combustion. This results in a form of vitrification of the shale, which then acquires sufficient mechanical strength to be of use in road construction. Some can therefore have a new life in being thus exploited; for example, the flattened pile of residue from the 11/19 site of Loos-en-Gohelle. Conversely, others are painstakingly preserved on account of their ecological wealth. With the passage of time, they become colonised with a variety of flora and fauna, sometimes foreign to the region. This diversity follows the mining exploitation. With the passage of time, spoil heaps can serve as a refuge for rare native plant species that benefit from reduced competition and low human disturbance. However, successful natural recovery heavily depends on the proximity to intact natural habitats as seed sources; in their absence, dumps are predominantly colonized by invasive species. In South Wales some spoil tips are protected as Sites of Special Scientific Interest because they provide a unique habitat for 57 species of lichen, several of which are at risk due to their limited environment being developed and by vegetation development.

For example, because the miners threw their apple or pear cores into the wagons, the spoil tips became colonised with fruit trees. One can even observe the proliferation of buckler-leaved sorrel (French sorrel – Rumex scutatus), the seeds of which have been carried within the cracks in the pine timber used in the mines. Furthermore, on account of its dark colour, the south face of the spoil tip is significantly warmer than its surroundings, which contributes to the diverse ecology of the area. In this way, the spoil tip of Pinchonvalles, at Avion, hosts 522 different varieties of higher plants. Some sixty species of birds nest there.

Some are used to cultivate vines, as in the case of Spoil Tip No. 7 of the coal-mining region of Mariemont-Bascoup near Chapelle-lez-Herlaimont (province of Hainaut). It produces some 3,000 litres of wine each year from a vineyard on its slopes.

Some spoil tips are used for various sporting activities. The slopes of the spoil tips of 11/19 at Loos-en-Gohelle, or again, at Nœux-les-Mines, are used for winter sports, for example ski and luge. A piste was built on the flank of the heap. In Belgium, a long distance footpath along the spoil tips (GR-412, Sentier des terrils) was opened in 2005. It leads from Bernissart in western Hainaut to Blegny in the province of Liège.

In the United States, coal mining companies have not been allowed to leave behind abandoned piles since the Surface Mining Control and Reclamation Act was passed in 1977. The Virginia City Hybrid Energy Center uses coal gob as a fuel source for energy production.

== Examples ==
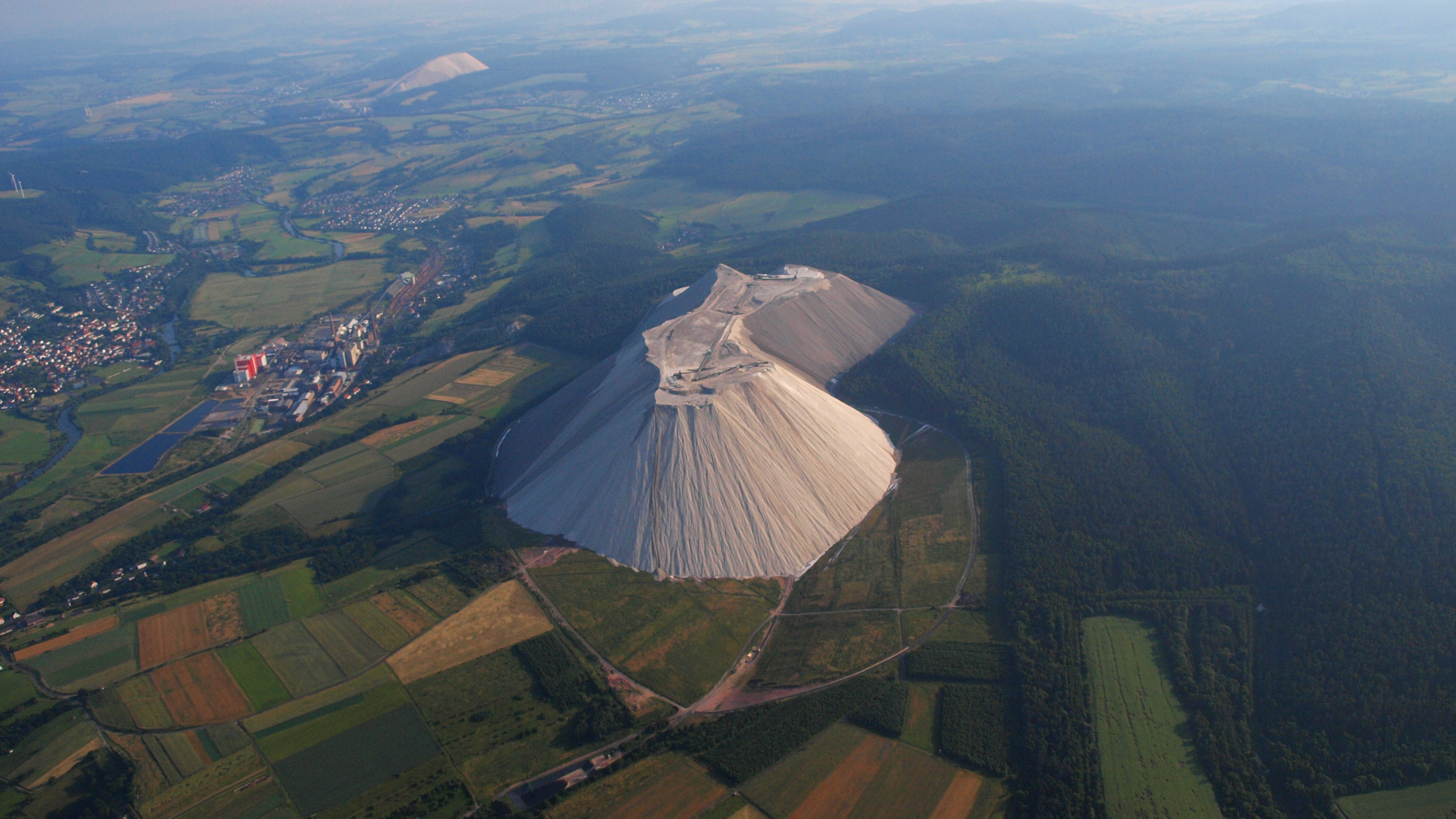
Spoil tip known as "Monte Kali" or "Kalimanjaro," in Heringen, Hesse, Germany with another spoil tip in the background

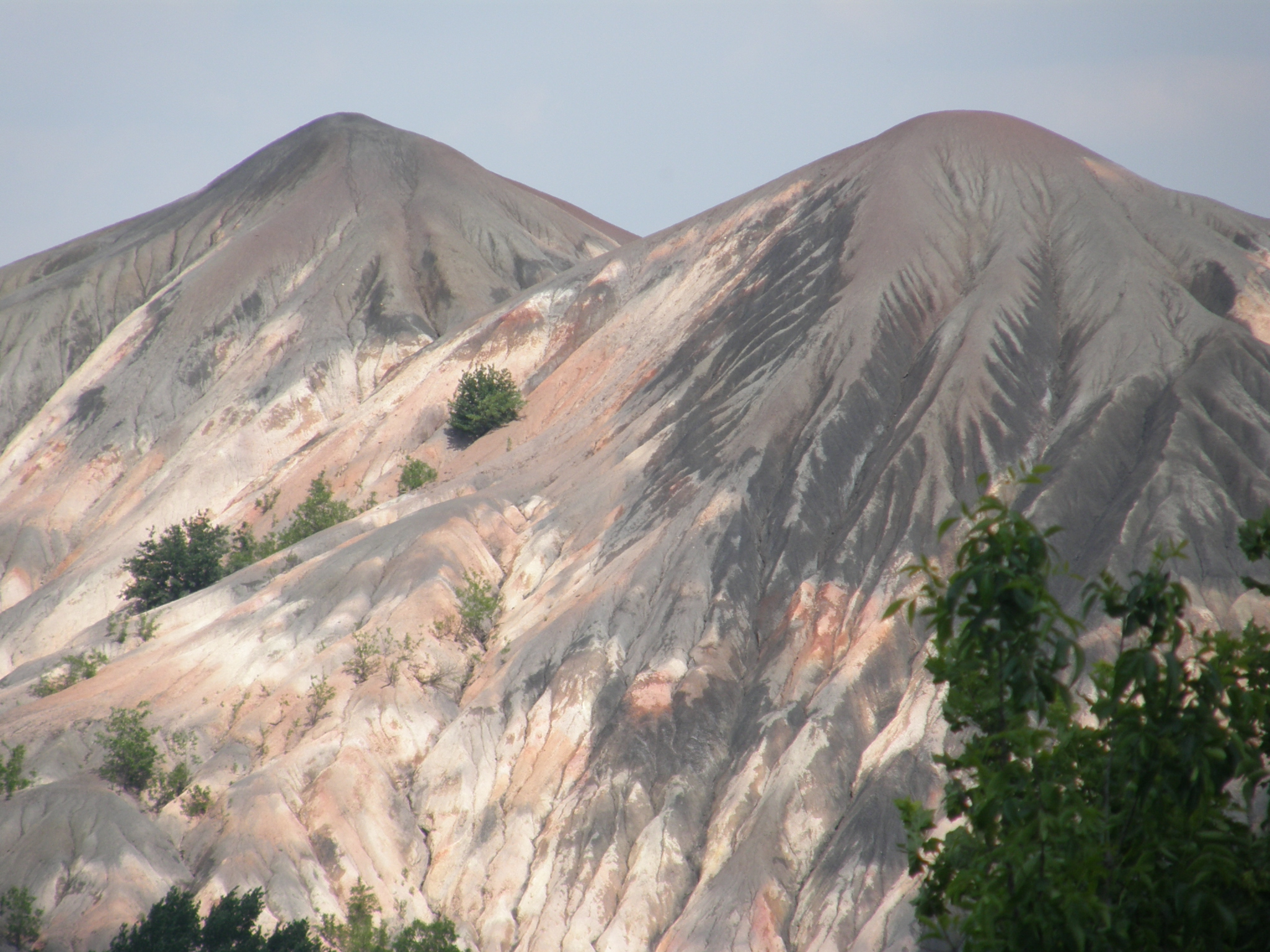
Spoil tip in Donetsk, Ukraine

One of the highest, at least in Western Europe, is in Loos-en-Gohelle in the former mining area of Pas-de-Calais, France. It comprises a range of five cones, of which two reach 180 metres (590 ft), surpassing the highest peak in Flanders, Mont Cassel. One of the regions of Europe most "littered" with (mountainous) spoil heaps is the Donbas, in Ukraine, especially around the city of Donetsk, which alone boasts about 130 of them. In Ukrainian, they are called terykony (терикони; singular терикон, terykon, 'soil cone') because of their shape.

In Heringen, Hesse, Germany, the spoil tip is the locally called "Monte Kali", made of spoil from potash mining and rising some 200 meters above the surrounding terrain. "La Muntanya de Sal" (The Salt Mountain), another potash mine spoil heap, lies in Cardona, Catalonia, at about 120 meters in height. A larger and higher pile is that of "El runam del Cogulló" (The Spoil Heap of El Cogulló), also known as "El runam de la democràcia" (The Slag Heap of Democracy) or "Montsalat" (Salty Mountain), in Sallent, which has already grown higher than the small mountain it was named after (El Cogulló, 474 meters above sea level).

== Literary references ==
Richard Llewellyn's novel How Green Was My Valley (1939) describes the social and environmental effects of coal mining in Wales at the turn of the 20th century. The local mine's spoil tip, which he calls a slag heap, is the central figure of devastation. Eventually the pile overtakes the entire valley and crushes Huw Morgan's house:

The slagheap is moving again.

I can hear it whispering to itself, and as it whispers, the walls of this brave little house are girding themselves to withstand the assault. For months, more than I ever thought it would have the courage to withstand, that great mound has borne down upon these walls, this roof. And for those months the great bully has been beaten, for in my father's day men built well for they were craftsmen. Stout beams, honest blocks, good work, and love for the job, all that is in this house.

But the slag heap moves, pressing on, down and down, over and all round this house which was my father's and my mother's and now is mine. Soon, perhaps in an hour, the house will be buried, and the slag heap will stretch from the top of the mountain right down to the river in the Valley. Poor river, how beautiful you were, how gay your song, how clear your green waters, how you enjoyed your play among the sleepy rocks.

— How Green Was My Valley

== See also ==
- Chat (mining)
- Minestone
- Pallaqueo
