= Tartu prison =

Prison in Tartu, Estonia

Tartu Vangla
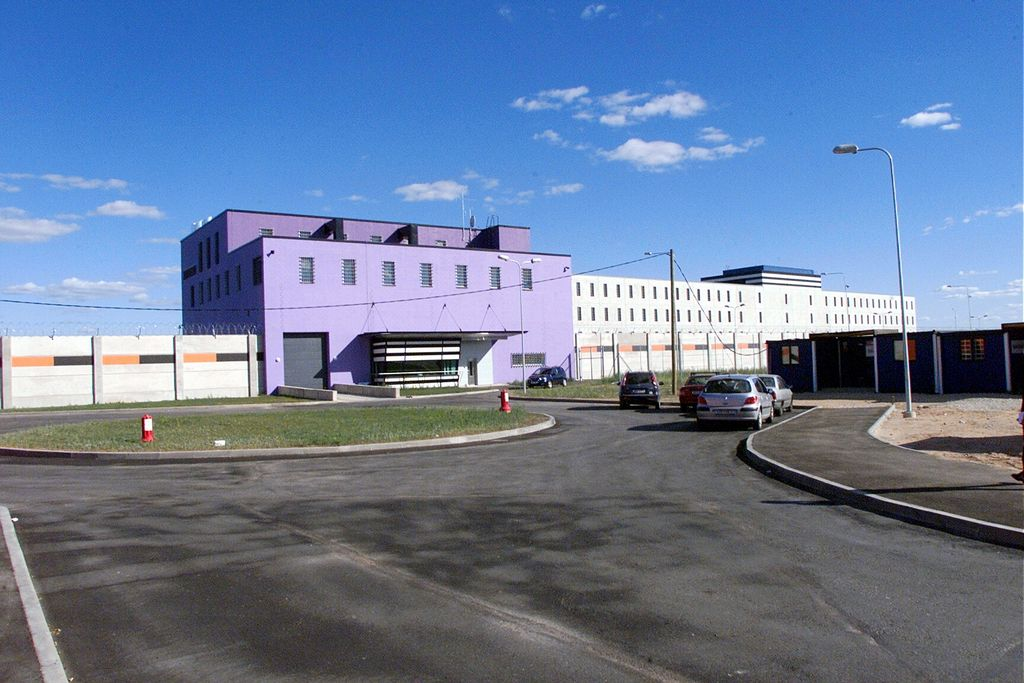
- The prison pictured in 2007
- Interactive map of Tartu Vangla
- Location: Turu 56, 51014 Tartu, Estonia; 58°20′39″N 26°44′47″E
- Status: Open
- Capacity: 998
- Opened: 16 October 2002
- Managed by: Estonian Department of Prisons

Notable prisoners
- Milan Lukić; Dragomir Milošević; Milan Martić; Aleksandr Rubel

Tartu prison (Estonian: Tartu vangla) is a prison located in the Ropka industrial district suburb of Tartu in Estonia. The prison was designed by architect Kalle Rõõmus, EstKONSULT and constructed by Skanska EMV. The prison was founded in 2000 with the first inmates arriving on 16 October 2002. The prison's total cost was 423 million Estonian kroons (≈27 million EUR), of which 365.8 million kroons was construction costs. The total area is 93,763 m^{2}.

Construction began after Parliament approved a €13,500,000 loan from Nordic Investment Bank.

In 2007, a drug-free center was opened in the prison. That same year the prison received an award from the World Health Organization for its HIV-themed project.

The prison holds several Serb war criminals including Dragomir Milošević, Milan Martić and Milan Lukić.

On 4 June 2025 it was announced that Sweden had come to an agreement with Estonia to lease up to 400 rooms at Tartu prison to hold up 600 Swedish prisoners, which would provide additional capacity for the currently stressed Swedish Prison and Probation Service.

== See also ==
- Prisons in Estonia
