= Murder of Cameron Blair =

2020 murder in Ireland

Cameron Blair
- Blair c. 2015
- Born: 18 June 1999; Cork, Ireland
- Died: 16 January 2020 (aged 20); Bandon Road, Cork, Ireland
- Cause of death: Stabbing
- Resting place: Kilbeg Cemetery, Kilbeg North, Bandon, Cork, Ireland; 51.7567°N 8.7212°W
- Known for: Murder victim
- Parent(s): Noel and Kathy Blair

Cameron Blair (18 June 1999 – 16 January 2020) was an Irish man who was fatally stabbed in the neck at a house party on the Bandon Road in Cork, Ireland on 16 January 2020. As the perpetrator was seventeen years old at the time of the killing, his name cannot be published under Irish law. (Note: According to section 252 of the Children Act, 2001 Archived 31 July 2021 at the Wayback Machine, in the Republic of Ireland it is an offense to reveal the name, address, school, or any other identifying information about individuals under the age of 18 who have been either the victim or the perpetrator of a crime. As of 2021, an exception is made for underage victims of homicide. In January 2024, in direct relation to this case, the Court of Appeal ruled that perpetrators (though not victims) of crimes as children may be named if they later appear before the courts as adults as part of their trials. The window to appeal this ruling will close in February 2024.) The seventeen-year-old was reported to have gatecrashed the party alongside two other teenagers who were charged with less serious offences. Blair was transported to Cork University Hospital, where he was pronounced dead a short time later. The teenage killer is currently serving a life sentence in prison. The ages of the victim and perpetrator, together with the murder taking place shortly after the killing of teenager Keane Mulready-Woods, resulted in the case becoming highly publicized in Ireland.

On 4 September 2020, several months after the murder took place, Noel Barry (from Togher, Cork) called Blair's father making threatening and offensive remarks, including threatening to kill members of Blair's family. He was sentenced to a total of three years in prison. In total, six people were charged with offences related to the incident: one for murder, one for violent disorder and production of an article capable of causing serious harm, one for violent disorder, one for making threatening remarks, and two for contempt of court.

== Background ==
Cameron Blair was a 20-year-old man from Ballinascarthy, Cork. A keen athlete, Blair was involved in rugby and athletics, and held a black belt in karate. He had attended Bandon Grammar School before going to college. At the time of his death he was living in Bishopstown while undertaking an undergraduate degree in engineering in the Cork Institute of Technology (now part of the Munster Technological University). On the night of his death, three of his friends came to his apartment for drinks before proceeding to a party on the Bandon Road. The party took place on the last night of University College Cork's "Fresher's Week".

== Night of the murder ==
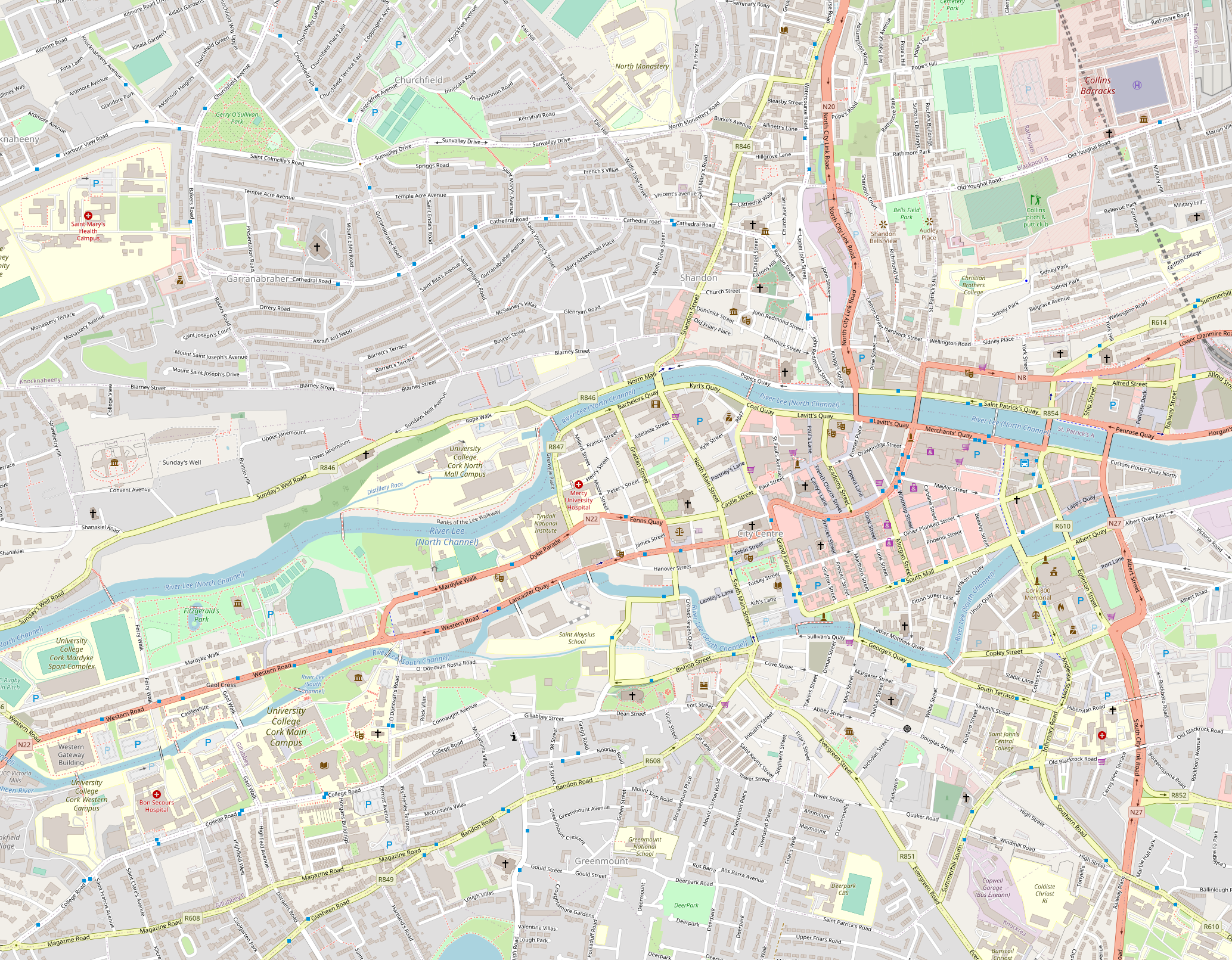
Location of the Bandon Road in Cork

On 16 January 2020, Cameron Blair was attending a student house party on the Bandon Road in Cork, Ireland. At approximately 7 p.m. a heavily intoxicated man in his forties forced his way into the house. Blair, who did not reside at the property, at one stage pushed the man out of the house. However, the latch on the front door was broken, and the man repeatedly attempted to return to the party, culminating in Darren O'Leary, one of the residents of the house, hitting the man, who fell onto the ground.

This was witnessed by a trio of local teenagers consisting of two unnamed teenagers, one seventeen-year-old and one fourteen-year-old, as well as eighteen-year-old Scott O'Connor. The seventeen-year-old and the fourteen-year-old cannot be named due to Irish law surrounding the identification of minors involved in criminal proceedings. The trio confronted Blair and O'Leary, which resulted in Blair convincing O'Leary to allow the group to join the party inside. During the party, O'Connor sourced cannabis for another party-goer. There followed a dispute surrounding the price of the drugs, which reportedly changed the atmosphere of the party. At roughly 9 p.m., O'Leary reportedly wanted all party-goers—"uninvited people" in particular—to leave the premises. The three teenagers left, but tensions escalated outside about whether the party was actually over or whether just the three of them were being made to leave. Pushing and shoving followed at the door of the house, with the seventeen-year-old and fourteen-year-old in particular trying to get back into the house. The fourteen-year-old punched a girl who was asking them to leave, prompting the trio to laugh at her. Blair has consistently been described as acting as a "peacemaker" in this altercation, trying to keep things calm and to break up the fight. The seventeen-year-old himself later admitted in court that "Cameron was nothing [other] than nice to me on the night, he did nothing wrong to me. It was never my intention for this to happen."

Just before 9:20 p.m., the trio of teenagers started alluding to knives they were carrying, which they then produced, before starting to threaten the occupants of the house. The knife which would be used by the seventeen-year-old to murder Blair was 21 centimetres (8.3 in) long. O'Connor was in possession of a 6 inches (15 cm)-long copper-coated kitchen knife, which he had taken from the house that was hosting the party. While O'Connor was later charged with producing an article capable of causing serious harm, the fourteen-year-old wielded a butter knife and so was not charged with the same offense.

Blair was murdered at approximately 9:20 p.m. when the seventeen-year-old lunged forward and fatally stabbed him in the neck, before fleeing the scene on foot with the other two teenagers. Blair staggered backwards into the property, reportedly unaware he had been stabbed. Blair lost consciousness, and was brought by ambulance to Cork University Hospital, where he was pronounced dead at 10.20 p.m. His last words were "Don't worry lad, I don't want to be fighting."

The fourteen-year-old later returned to the scene, before once again fleeing on foot. He was apprehended shortly afterward.

== Trials ==
=== Seventeen-year-old ===
==== District Court ====
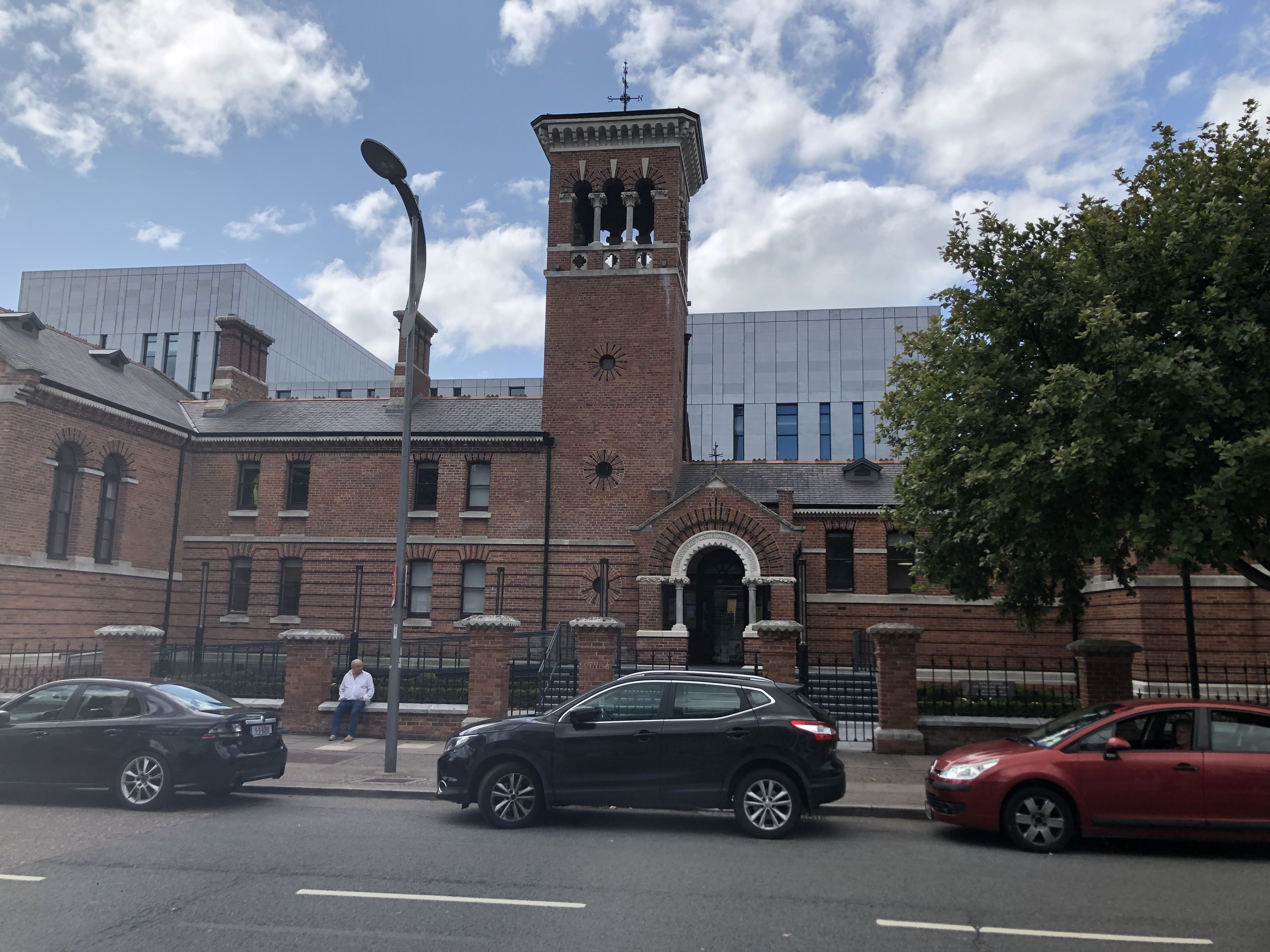
Cork Courthouse, Anglesea Street, which hosts the criminal division of both the Cork District Court and Circuit Court

The seventeen-year-old was arrested on 23 January 2020, and brought before a special sitting of the Cork District Court the following night. He was charged with the murder of Blair by Judge Olann Kelleher. Detective Garda Rory O'Connell gave evidence of the arrest of the teenager, who made no reply to the charge. The hearing lasted two minutes. The seventeen-year-old was remanded to Oberstown Children Detention Campus.

==== Circuit Court ====
On 31 January and 21 February 2020, the seventeen-year-old appeared before the Cork Children's Court, a branch of the Circuit Court, on Angelsea Street. A a psychological assessment of the teenager was requested at both hearings.

All three teenagers appeared before Cork Children's Court for a hearing on 5 March 2020, whereupon they were remanded to the Central Criminal Court. The seventeen-year-old was remanded in custody; the fourteen-year-old and O'Connor on bail.

==== Central Criminal Court ====
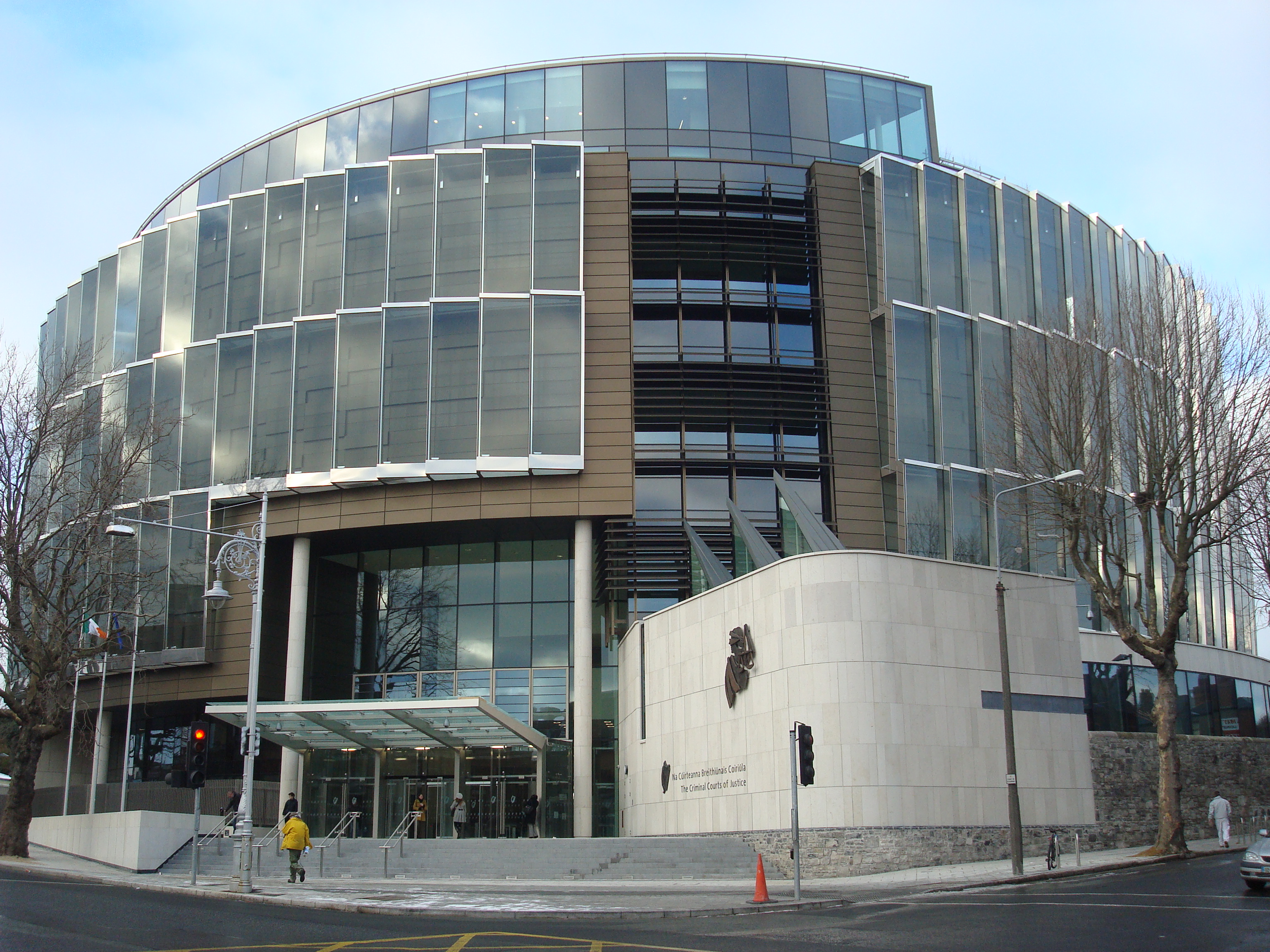
The Criminal Courts of Justice, Dublin, which hosts the Central Criminal Court

On 13 March 2020, the seventeen-year-old appeared before the Central Criminal Court, with Mr Justice Paul McDermott presiding. The trial took place in Dublin, despite a request from the deceased's family for the proceedings to take place in Cork. The seventeen-year-old pleaded guilty to the charge of murdering Blair. The court adjourned until April, when a sentencing hearing took place. In the interim, the seventeen-year-old was returned to Oberstown Children Detention Campus and underwent psychological evaluation.

On 3 April 2020, the seventeen-year-old appeared before a sentencing hearing of the Central Criminal Court. Blair's father, mother, and brother delivered victim impact statements. The seventeen-year-old presented the Blair family with a letter of apology.

The seventeen-year-old was sentenced to life imprisonment on 20 April 2020, backdated to 24 January 2020. The sentence will be reviewed in 2032, meaning that the earliest the teenager could be released from prison is 24 January 2033. Mr Justice McDermott described the manner in which Blair was killed as "vicious, deliberate, and cowardly", noting that Blair was unarmed, not anticipating the attack, made no effort of self-defense, and "was not a threat" to his assailant.

On 22 April 2020, the teenager lodged an appeal against his life sentence. While life imprisonment is the mandatory sentence in Ireland for adults found guilty of murder, there is no such mandate for the sentencing of minors.

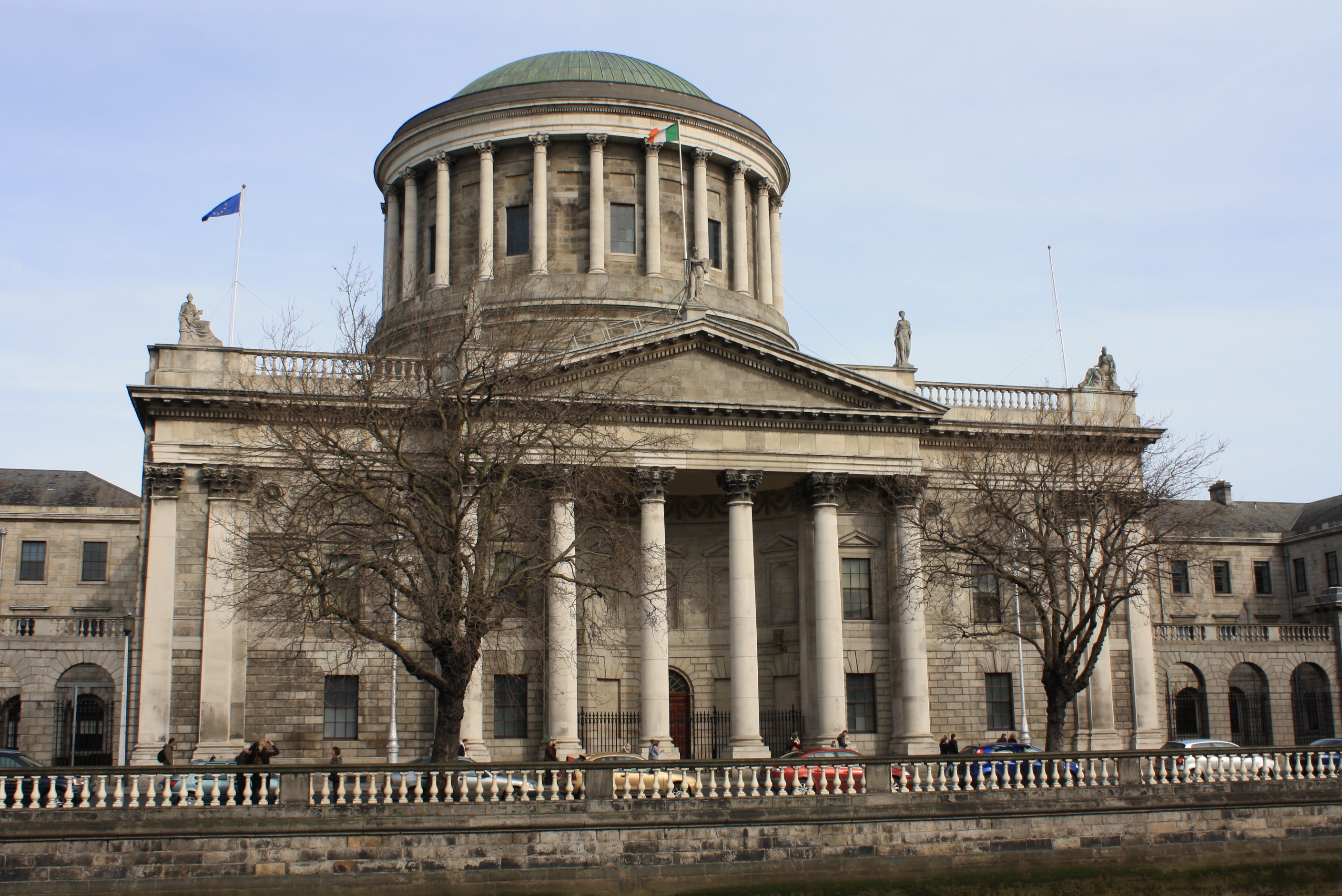
The Four Courts, Dublin, which hosts the Irish Court of Appeal.

==== Appeal Court ====
In May 2023, Blair's murderer's appeal against the validity of his incarceration came before the Irish Court of Appeal. An error in the sentencing of the unnamed teenager had resulted in his receiving of the sentence of detention for life with a review after thirteen years. In Ireland, adults cannot be sentenced to detention, and imprisonment was not an option before the sentencing court. As a result, the Director of Public Prosecutions made the case that the only option the appeal court had was to make "no order" which would "result in the immediate release of the applicant". A trio of appeal court judges led by Ms Justice Isobel Kennedy ruled that if the Appeal Court found that an error had been made in the sentencing of a juvenile, the court would not be in the position to impose a new sentence upon that child having turned eighteen. It was reported that had the sentencing been found to have been improper, the killer may have been permitted to walk free. In December 2023, the killer's appeal was rejected by the court. The court found that the sentencing judge had set an appropriate sentence, and had taken adequate account of the killer's immaturity and other mitigating factors.

Due to the appeal beginning when the killer was an adult, Blair's parents sought the right for his name to be published. There was initially some confusion as to whether an adult who committed a crime as a child was entitled to anonymity if still before the courts as an adult. In January 2024, the court ruled that children before the courts for a criminal offence are only granted anonymity until they turn eighteen, after which point they may be publicly named. Considered a landmark ruling in Ireland, it has implications for all child-offenders who fail to finish their trials before they turn eighteen, including the perpetrators of the high-profile Murder of Ana Kriégel, both of whom were fourteen at the time of the killing and will be appearing before the courts as adults in the coming years. On 15 February the killer appealed the ruling, and he will remain anonymous at least until the Supreme Court rules on the matter.

=== Fourteen-year-old ===
The fourteen-year-old's lawyer, Timothy O'Leary, described him as "an impressionable and impulsive young person with a lack of emotional development".

==== Circuit Court ====
On 5 March 2020, the fourteen-year-old was brought before Judge Mary Dorgan, along with the other two suspects. The fourteen-year-old was charged with violent disorder and production of an article capable of inflicting serious harm. He did not respond to the charges, and was remanded on bail. His role in Blair's death reportedly made him a pariah in his community while he awaited trial.

==== Central Criminal Court ====
On Friday 28 May 2021, the boy pleaded guilty to the charge of committing violent disorder, but refuted the claim that he had produced a knife capable of causing harm. Initially, the teenager's defense claimed that while the seventeen-year-old and O'Connor were armed with knives, the fourteen-year-old was not. The fourteen-year-old later conceded he had been in possession of a butter knife. Witnesses claimed that they heard the fourteen-year-old express a desire to "shank people with it". Two witnesses involved in the trial left the country to avoid testifying. The trial subsequently "collapsed", with the DPP deciding not to proceed with the charge. As a result, his sentencing was based only on the charge of committing violent disorder.

On Friday 23 July 2021, the fourteen-year-old teenager, who was sixteen at the time of sentencing, was sentenced to two years detention followed by two years of community supervision.

==== Uncooperative witnesses ====
During the trial of the youngest suspect, two witnesses left Ireland to avoid testifying in court. Darragh O'Connor and Craig O'Donoghue travelled to Ayia Napa, Cyprus in order to avoid giving evidence. Upon their return to Ireland in July 2021, both men were charged with what O'Connor's sentencing judge described as "calculated and deliberate" contempt of court, and were each jailed for two months in two separate hearings. O'Donoghue was also ordered to pay a €1,000 fine.

In August 2021, having served less than one month of his sentence, O'Donoghue was accidentally released from prison. A system error calculated that O'Donoghue was entitled to remission, but this is not available to prisoners jailed for contempt of court in Ireland. (Note: This is due to Rule 59 (3) Archived 19 January 2022 at the Wayback Machine of the Irish Statutory Instrument Prison Rules, 2007, which forbids the remission of a prisoner's sentence under certain conditions, including when they have been convicted for contempt of court.) Within a week of his release, Gardaí arrived at his home to re-arrest him, but he wasn't there. The following day, the 17 August, O'Donoghue went to Cork Prison of his own volition to be re-committed.

==== Release ====
The teenager who was fourteen-years-old at the time of the murder was released in January 2023, then aged eighteen-years-old. He received a 25% remission on his sentence, an automatic entitlement for prisoners in Ireland who are not found guilty of further offences while incarcerated. Initially due to receive a further five-week remission, this was rescinded following complaints from Blair's parents.

=== Scott O'Connor ===
==== Circuit Court ====
On 5 March 2020, Scott O'Connor, of Churchfield, Cork, was brought before Judge Mary Dorgan, along with the seventeen-year-old murder suspect and the fourteen-year-old offender. Judge Dorgan refused to deal with O'Connor as, given that he was 18 years old, he did not qualify to appear before the Children's Court. O'Connor was instead referred to the Cork District Court, where he was dealt with by Judge Olann Kelleher. He was charged with producing a knife and engaging in violent disorder. In response to the charges, O'Connor claimed that he "wasn't involved". He was remanded on bail.

==== Central Criminal Court ====
On 5 July 2021, O'Connor appeared before Mr Justice David Keane of the Central Criminal Court. Ronan Munro, O'Connor's defense counsel, admitted to the court that his client had been "clearly threatening violence" on the night of Cameron's murder, and had been brandishing a knife. This was a deviation from previous comments made by O'Connor to his probation officer, in which he had minimized his role in the altercation with Blair. Mr. Munro told the court that the defendant accepted the sequence of events presented by the prosecution.

O'Connor pleaded guilty to committing violent disorder and to producing an article capable of inflicting serious injury. Mr Justice Keane originally set a headline sentence of seven years for the charge of violent disorder, but reduced it to five due to mitigating factors including O'Connor's history of mental health issues. Of the five years, three were suspended. Mr Justice Keane also set a headline sentence of three years regarding the production of the knife, which he reduced to two years. O'Connor was sentenced to two years for violent disorder and two years for the production of the knife. The teenager's sentences are to run concurrently and were backdated to when he went into custody.

==== Appeal by Director of Public Prosecutions ====
In March 2022, the Director of Public Prosecutions appealed Mr Justice Keane's decision regarding the reduction of O'Connor's sentence, arguing that the judge was too lenient when he suspended three years of O'Connor's five-year sentence. Though O'Connor was not Blair's killer, the prosecution have alleged that he instigated the confrontation which resulted in Blair's death. Mr Justice John Edwards presided over the hearing in the Court of Appeal, alongside Ms Justice Isobel Kennedy and Mr Patrick McCarthy. On 5 April 2022, the court ruled in favour of the DPP and reduced the suspended portion of O'Connor's sentence from three to two years, effectively increasing his stay in prison by one year. In a statement delivered by Kennedy, the court said that it agreed with the DPP's argument that suspending three years of O'Connor's sentence had constituted a "substantial difference from the norm".

== Aftermath ==
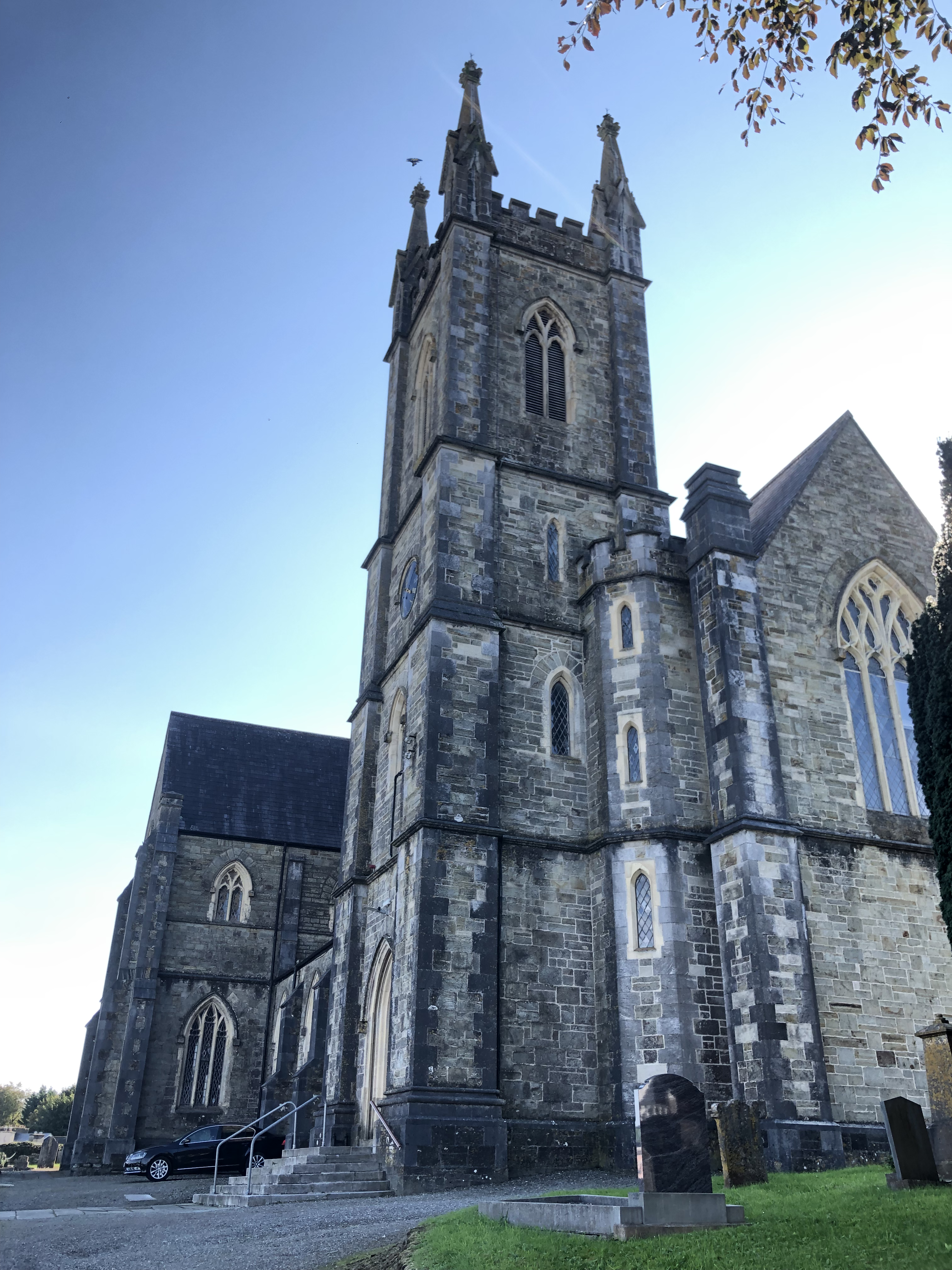
St. Peter's Church, Bandon, where Blair's memorial service was held

=== Memorial ===
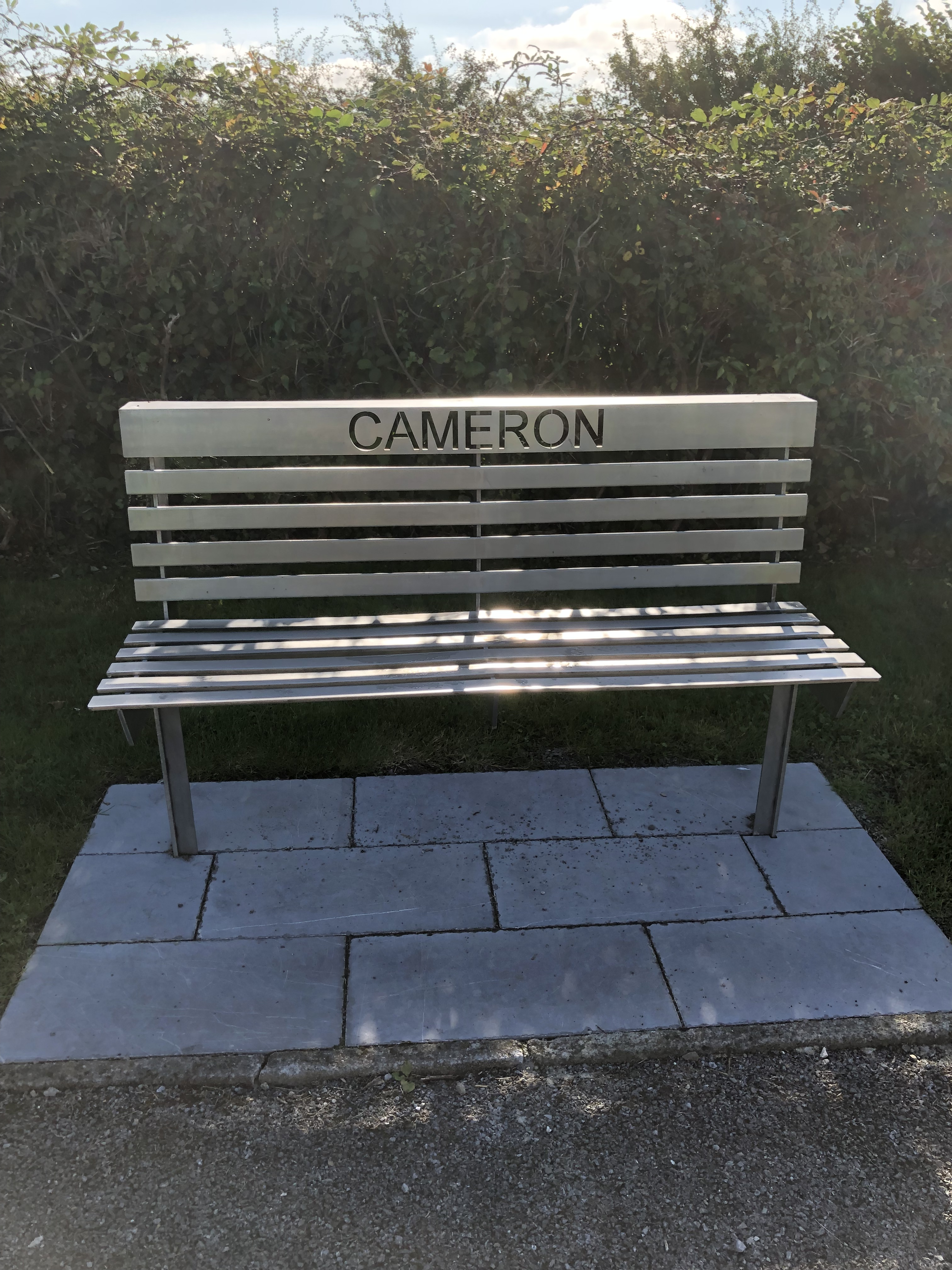
A bench in Kilbeg Cemetery dedicated to the memory of Blair

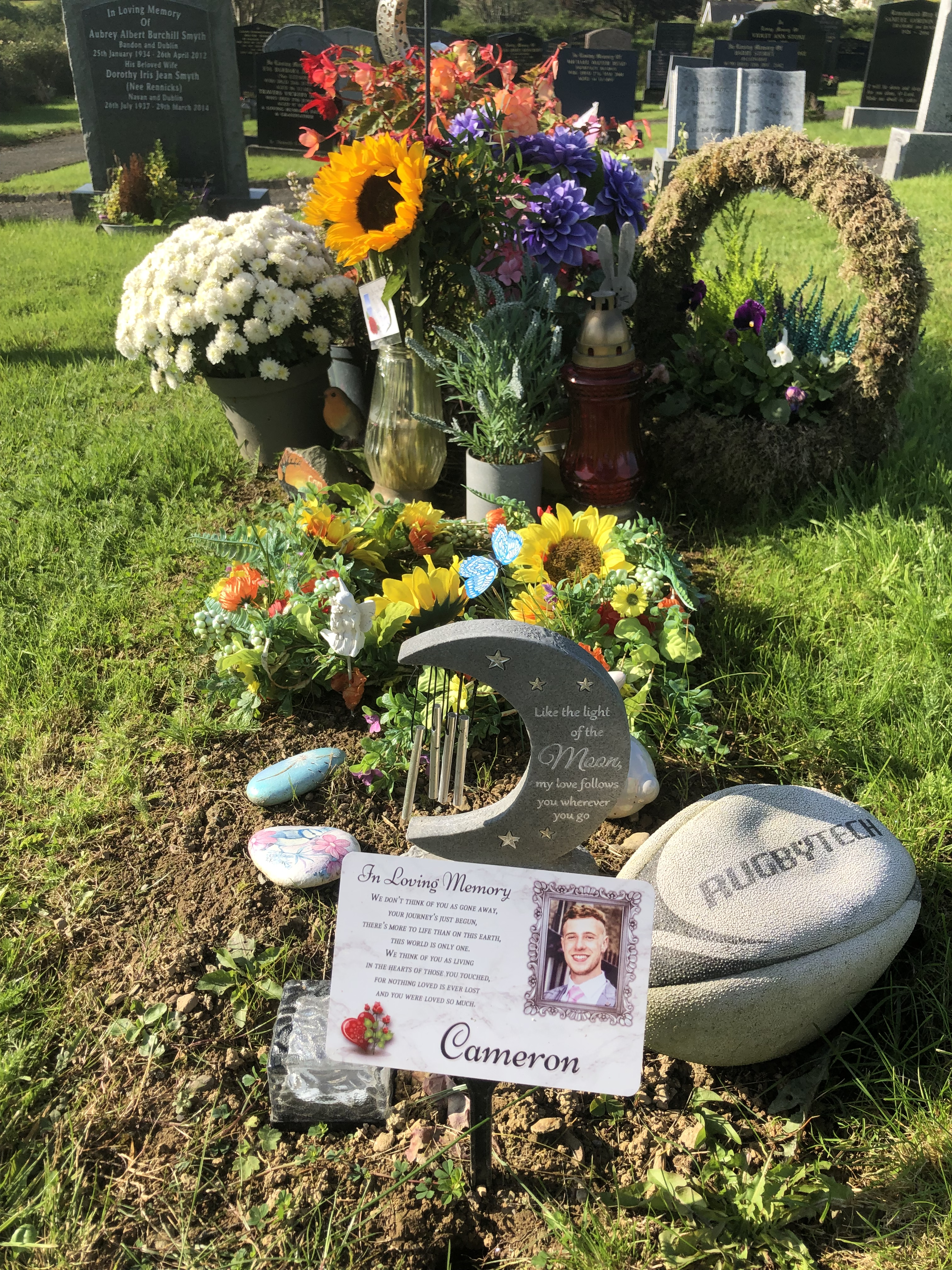
Blair's grave in Kilbeg Cemetery in September 2021. No headstone had been erected by the time this photograph was taken.

Rev Anne Suske, who had been the chaplain at the secondary school Blair had attended, led a memorial service for him at St Peter's Church, Bandon, on 26 January 2020. His body was then taken to Kilbeg Cemetery for burial. Approximately 800 people attended the memorial service. Dr Paul Colton, Bishop of the Church of Ireland Diocese of Cork Cloyne and Ross offered his condolences to the family.

=== Political response ===
After Blair's death, which occurred during a period of unusually high rates of violent crime both in Cork and across Ireland, increased pressure was placed on Taoiseach Leo Varadkar's government to reduce violent crime in Ireland. Micheál Martin, then leader of the opposition, claimed that Varadkar's government was "losing control" of the nation. This, combined with gangland shootings in Dublin, made violent crime a central election issue in the 2020 Irish general election.

In October 2021, Blair's parents met with Justice Minister Heather Humphreys to discuss the possibility of launching a campaign aimed at educating secondary school students about the dangers of knife crime. According to the Blairs, Humphreys reportedly said that she thought the Blairs' idea of a campaign which would show second-level students graphic depictions of knife violence was a "brilliant idea", though her department did not commit themselves to the campaign. The minister is reportedly also examining the possibility of making the parents of young offenders more responsible for the actions of their children.

==== Knife crime in Ireland ====
Despite reports in 2020 that knife crime was a growing issue in Ireland, Garda Commissioner Drew Harris, speaking in February 2021, denied claims made by the media that between 2019 and 2020 that Ireland had experienced a "huge spike in knife crime". Though the number of knife attack victims hospitalised in Ireland grew by 14 between 2018 and 2019, representing a growth of 8.5%, the numbers remained lower across the 2012–2019 period than the period spanning 2006–2011. Despite a "dramatic" growth in knife seizures between 2016 and 2020, this has not been linked by the commissioner or the media to an increase in knife attacks, but rather a change from a paper to an electronic recording system and the numbers of the Garda force reaching an all-time high. Furthermore, according to Garda statistics, knives accounted for an all-time low proportion of objects seized by Gardaí. In Ireland, one in every six knives seized by Gardaí is taken from children aged between twelve and seventeen.

The homicide rate in Ireland was 23rd lowest in the world in 2019, and historically the proportion of underage perpetrators of homicide in Ireland has been comparatively low. (~10%). However, the use of a sharp object in committing homicide is significantly higher among this age group, accounting for 53% of homicides perpetrated by this age group, as opposed to 26.8% overall.

=== Threats to family ===
On 4 September 2020, a man named Noel Barry made "grossly offensive and menacing" phone calls to the Blair family. Though it was later revealed that Barry was under the influence of alcohol at the time of the calls, the sentencing judge noted that Barry had researched his crime beforehand by obtaining Noel Blair's phone number. Barry rang Noel Blair, Cameron's father, four times and threatened to burn his wife, Kathy, and surviving son, Alan, to death, among other threats. He said that the Blair family would "never be safe", and that Noel Blair had "better be standing beside [his] wife and other son with a fire extinguisher" threatening that they would "be burned at the petrol station." Barry initially denied making the threats. On 23 April 2021 he confessed to making the threatening calls. He pleaded guilty to two charges of threatening to kill or cause serious harm to named members of Blair's family, and one charge of sending a menacing message by phone to a named member of the Blair family. On 20 May 2021, Barry was sentenced to three years in prison, with the final year suspended. He further mandated that Barry have no contact with the Blairs for five years. The sentencing judge described the case as "almost incomprehensible".

In October 2021, the abuse Barry directed at the Blair family was provided by journalist Frank Coughlan as an example of ongoing anti-Protestant sectarianism in Ireland. Along with threats against the safety of his family, Noel Blair had been told to "fuck off back to England", and to get his "Loyalist friends" so that Barry and Blair could "sort this out on the streets of Shankill Road". Barry was released in 2023.

== See also ==
- Killing of Keane Mulready-Woods
