= Dóchas Centre =

Women's prison in Dublin, Ireland

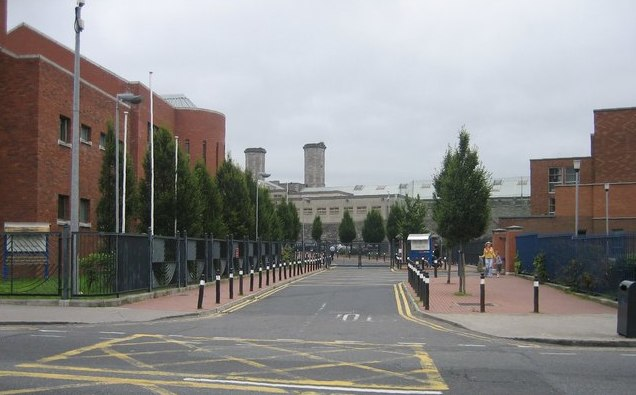

- Location in Central Dublin
- Location: Phibsborough, Dublin; 53°21′42.3″N 6°16′2.8″W
- Status: Operational
- Security class: Medium security
- Capacity: 105
- Opened: 1999
- Closed: Operational
- Managed by: Irish Prison Service
- Governor: Mary O'Connor

The Dóchas Centre (Irish: lárionad le Dóchas) is a closed, medium security prison, for females aged 18 years and over, located in Mountjoy Prison in Dublin, Ireland. It is also the committal prison for females committed on remand or sentenced from all Courts outside the Munster area of Ireland.

Dóchas is one of two women's prisons in Ireland, the other is located in Limerick Prison. It has a staff of 88 not including teachers, chaplains, nurses, probation and welfare, doctors, psychiatrists and counsellors.

Dóchas [ˈd̪ˠoːxəsˠ] is Irish for hope making the literal name of the prison "Centre for Hope." In 2022, the prison was renamed to Mountjoy Female Prison.

== History ==
Mountjoy Female Prison opened in 1858 and has been the largest female prison in the country ever since. In 1956 the female prison at Mountjoy was given over to young male offenders and became St. Patrick's Institution. The small numbers of women at the time were moved to a basement of one wing of St Patrick's Institution. Female prisoners were detained in the basement until 1990 when they were moved into one wing of St Patrick's Institution. The wing was used for female prisoners until 1999 when women moved into the Dóchas Centre. A campus style female prison within Mountjoy Prison, Dóchas was designed for twice the number of female prisoners that the old wing of St. Patrick's Institution could accommodate.

== Ethos ==
The ethos of the centre is for inmates to live as close as possible to a life in ordinary accommodation. The prison operates with inmates expected to behave in the same way as one would manage their own home in relation to cleaning, cooking, laundering etc. The regimes within the centre is on training and development. These activities are structured like a normal working day. Staff are encouraged to wear civilian clothing rather than uniforms.

== Accommodation and Facilities ==
Prisoners are accommodated in seven separate houses with each house accommodating ten to twelve people except for one called Cedar which can accommodate eighteen women. The pre-release centre called Phoenix accommodates women in private rooms or in self-contained studio apartments. Inmates live in en-suite rooms with keys to their rooms meaning they can move about relatively freely. Houses are locked at 7.30pm with all the women in the prison being locked into their rooms at that time except for women in Cedar and Phoenix Houses. Houses and rooms are unlocked at 7.30am. Prisoners organise their own breakfasts in the kitchens of the houses and eat lunch with prison staff in the dining room with an evening meal being served in the dining room at 5pm. Each house has a kitchen/dining room with sitting room facility which contains a television and reading material.

Mothers are permitted to keep new born babies with them in the centre but when the children reach 12 months old, they must leave the prison.

=== Education and training programmes ===
The centre offers training and education programmes to inmates. These include:- hairdressing, beauty therapy and photography as well as FETAC programmes and Leaving and Junior Cert courses. There is a gym which runs aerobic classes and a sport and fitness programme as well as an outdoor basketball court.

There is also a Health Care Unit staffed by nurses and a doctor with a visiting psychiatric and dental service.

== Prisoner profile ==
The centre holds women on remand, women awaiting sentencing, sentenced prisoners, and women detained under immigration legislation. The director-general of the Irish Prison Service, Brian Purcell, categorised the inmates as a quarter serving sentences for murder, manslaughter or conspiracy to murder, another quarter serving sentences of over a year for robbery, theft or criminal-damage offences with a 20% plus serving sentences for possession of drugs for the purpose of supply.

Drugs are a problem with inmates with cannabis being the most common although E tablets have been found. Approximately 30% of the prisoners are on methadone maintenance.

Although the prison is designated to accommodate females over 18 years of age, there has been cases of juveniles being remanded to the centre.

== Controversies ==
=== Prisoner pictures in the media ===
In August 2008, pictures taken on a mobile phone appeared in the media of Scissor sisters killers, Charlotte Mulhall holding a knife to a male inmate's throat. The resulting fallout led to a security audit being carried out at the prison with the installation of walk through detectors and X-ray scanners at the prison. Mulhall herself was transferred to Limerick Prison. Fine Gael justice spokesman Charles Flanagan said: "Prisoners are holding up two fingers to the criminal justice system and these pictures show that prison security is a shambles. It beggars belief that a convicted knife murderer would be allowed access to a potentially lethal kitchen knife". Labour Party justice spokesman Pat Rabbitte asked "How is it that a prisoner convicted of a particularly gruesome murder was apparently in possession of what appears to be a potentially lethal knife?"

=== Overcrowding controversy ===
Dochas is designed to accommodate 85 prisoners but frequently runs at 136 per cent capacity, around 115 prisoners.

In April 2010 Governor Kathleen McMahon announced her resignation as governor of the Dochas Centre fearing a reversion to "self-mutilation, bullying, depression and lesbianism". One of the features of the prison was that each prisoner had their own room. In the weeks leading up to her resignation there were cases where five inmates were sharing a room. The resignation was as a result of a failure by the Department of Justice to consult her about putting in bunk beds to hold more prisoners. As of June 2010, 106 inmates were in custody with a further 73 inmates on temporary release.

Overcrowding has been compounded by homelessness with some prisoners being granted release refusing to leave as they have nowhere to live. In one case an inmate who was granted early release was arrested after trying to break in by scaling the gate of the prison to return to the centre.

== High profile inmates ==
The centre has housed and continues to house a number of high-profile inmates, these include:-

- Shell to Sea activist, Maura Harrington.
- Catherine Nevin
- Scissor Sisters killers Linda and Charlotte Mulhall and their mother.

== Future ==
There are plans to replace the Dóchas Centre with a new women's prison as part of the planned Thornton Hall prison complex.

== See also ==
- Prisons in Ireland
- Administrative detention
