= Cloverhill Prison =

Remand prison in Dublin, Ireland

- Location in Dublin
- Location: Clondalkin Dublin 22 Ireland D22 WC84; 53.3425°N 6.3842°W
- Status: Operational
- Security class: Medium security
- Capacity: 431
- Population: 424 (2022)
- Opened: 1999
- Managed by: Irish Prison Service
- Governor: Tony Harris

Cloverhill Prison (Irish: Príosún Chnoc na Seamar), officially Cloverhill Remand Prison, is a remand prison in Dublin, Ireland. It is on Cloverhill Road, Clondalkin, Dublin 22. It has a bed capacity of 431 and its average daily number of inmates in 2022 was 424.

== History ==
Adjacent to Wheatfield Prison, with which it shares many services, Cloverhill was opened in 1999. It is a purpose-built remand prison and houses most of the remand prisoners in the state.

It and the Dóchas Centre, a women's prison, hold 90 per cent of persons detained under processes of administration detention for immigration related issues.

In 2024, The Council of Europe's Committee for the Prevention of Torture toured the prisons of Ireland, assessing the living conditions onsite. In their report, the Committee were "particularly critical" of Cloverhill Prison in Dublin where inmates were "subject to a degrading regime, including squalid cells shared by up to four men sleeping on mattresses on the floor. Taken together, this situation, in the Committee's view, may well be described as inhuman and degrading treatment." According to the Irish Times, the Irish Human Rights and Equality Commission called for the State to "urgently ratify the UN Optional Protocol to the Convention Against Torture (OPCAT)."

== See also ==
- Prisons in Ireland
