= St. Patrick's Institution =

Former prison for young offenders in Dublin, Ireland (1850–2013)

- Location in Central Dublin
- Location: North Circular Road, Phibsborough, Dublin, Ireland; 53.3618°N 6.2702°W
- Status: closed
- Security class: Medium security
- Capacity: 217
- Population: 221 (2009)
- Opened: 1850; 176 years ago
- Closed: 2013
- Managed by: Irish Prison Service

St. Patrick's Institution, North Circular Road, Dublin 7, was an Irish penal facility for 16- to 21-year-old males. It had a capacity of 217 beds and had an average inmate population of 221 in 2009. It was a closed, medium security prison.

== History ==
It was opened in 1956 when inmates from the borstal located in Clonmel, County Tipperary were transferred there. Prior to this, the facility had functioned as the female section of Mountjoy Prison from its opening in 1850. Although situated within the Mountjoy Prison Complex, it was administered as a completely separate facility. An education unit was built in the last 20 years. In 2002 a new unit to cater for boys aged between fourteen and sixteen years was built but up until 2004 this had not been used.

== Abuse ==
A report on St. Patrick's Institution released on 16 October 2012 found a culture of human rights abuse.

== Closure ==
It was announced on 1 July 2013 that St. Patrick's Institution was to close. On 7 April 2017, the last remaining wing of the Institution was closed. It has since been amalgamated into the Mountjoy Prison Complex and is known as Mountjoy West.

== See also ==
- Prisons in Ireland
