= Wheatfield Prison =

Prison located in Clondalkin, Dublin, Ireland

Wheatfield Place of Detention
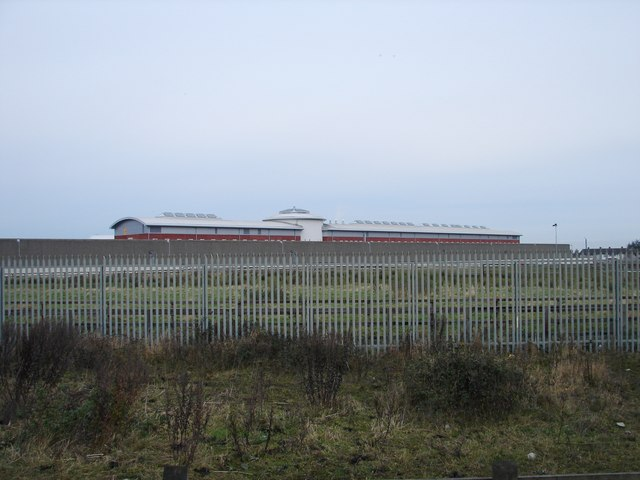
- The facility in 2008

- Location in Dublin
- Location: Clondalkin Dublin 22 Ireland D22 Y2V5; 53.3410°N 6.3826°W
- Status: Operational
- Security class: Medium security
- Capacity: 540
- Population: 426 (2009)
- Opened: 1989
- Managed by: Irish Prison Service
- Governor: Martin O’Neill

Wheatfield Place of Detention (Irish: Príosún Pháirc na Cruithneachta) is a closed, medium security prison located on Cloverhill Road, Clondalkin, Dublin 22. It receives male prisoners of 17 years of age and older from the counties of Louth, Meath, Monaghan, Wexford and Wicklowas well as portions of Dublin. It has a bed capacity of 430 and in 2009 the average daily number of inmates resident was 426. The prison is one of 3 prisons in Dublin.

== History ==
The construction of Wheatfield Prison began in 1980 and it opened nine years later in 1989. Cloverhill Prison, a remand prison, is located on a site adjacent to it. Both institutions share many of the same facilities. The prison was used in the TV series The Governor by ITV in 1994, and in Love/Hate for RTÉ in 2013.

== Attempted drug smuggling via UAV ==
Around 11am on 24 June 2014 a quadcopter crashed into an exercise yard of the prison. The quadcopter collided with wires designed to prevent helicopters landing to aid escapes, causing it to crash. A package containing drugs hung from the quadcopter by a rope and was seized by a group of prisoners before prison staff could get to it. One prisoner swallowed the drugs and was placed into solitary confinement along with several others. The quadcopter was badly damaged by the crash, though an unsuccessful attempt was made to fly it out of the prison.

== See also ==
- Prisons in Ireland
