= Murder of Ana Kriégel =

2018 murder in Ireland

Coordinates: 53.3628°N 6.4563°W

Ana Kriégel
- Born: Anastasia; 18 February 2004; Novokuznetsk, Kemerovo Oblast, Russia
- Died: 14 May 2018 (age 14); Glenwood House, Coldblow, Lucan, County Dublin, Ireland
- Cause of death: Blunt force trauma to the head
- Body discovered: 17 May 2018

Anastasia "Ana" Kriégel (/kriːˈeɪʒəl/; 18 February 2004 – 14 May 2018) was a Russian-Irish girl who was subject to a violent attack, murder and sexual assault in an abandoned house in May 2018 in Lucan near Dublin. Two boys, known as Boy A and Boy B, who were 13 years old at the time of Kriégel's death, were convicted of her murder, with one of the boys (Boy A) being further convicted of aggravated sexual assault. The two convicts are the youngest in the history of Ireland to be charged with murder.

Murder site marked on a map of Greater Dublin.

== Ana Kriégel ==
=== Early life ===
Anastasia (Russian: Анастасия) was born in Novokuznetsk, Russia in 2004 and placed in an orphanage. In 2006, she was adopted by Geraldine Kriégel and her French-born husband Patric Kriégel (who died in June 2022, four years after the murder) and came to live in Ireland. Though her parents had no cultural links to Russia themselves, they tried to make sure she kept connections with Russian culture, such as keeping her original given name.

=== Growing up in Ireland ===
Kriégel was said to be a happy girl during most of her time in primary school, despite some health issues, such as a tumour that had to be removed from her right ear, which left her nearly deaf in that ear. She also suffered from sight problems. She struggled to make friends at the secondary school she attended. She was suspended for painting a black eye onto herself; her mother thinks that the painted eye was an expression of the pain she felt inside. She suffered from bullying, and self-harmed on one occasion in 2017. Some of the bullying began before she started secondary school with online bullying about her height and the fact that she was adopted. Some of the bullying messages were of a sexual nature. She also set up fake social media accounts to "bully" herself. After this, her mother insisted that Ana give her the passwords to all her apps, so her mother could check them.

=== Disappearance ===
On 14 May 2018, Ana attended a counselling session. She went home from school, changed out of uniform and walked to Leixlip town centre. She came back and went up to her room before the child later known as Boy B called to the Kriégel home at 5:00 p.m. This was unusual; Ana's mother Geraldine recalled that Ana had no friends and that "nobody calls for Ana."

Ana was last seen at 5:30 p.m. in St Catherine's Park.

== Discovery, investigation and trial ==
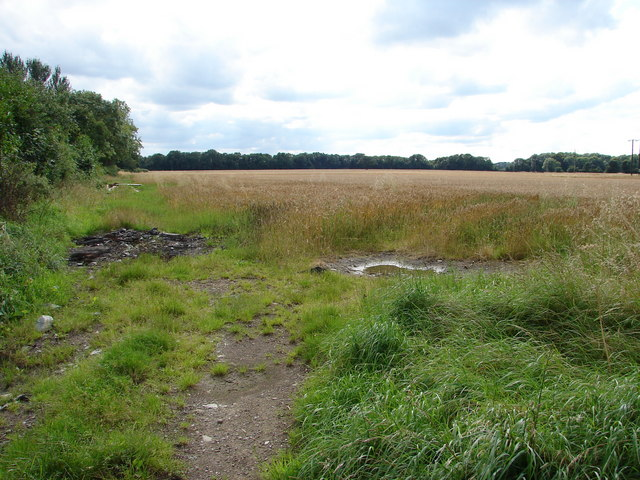
A field in Coldblow, the townland in Lucan where Glenwood House is located

Ana Kriégel's body was found on Thursday, 17 May 2018 in Glenwood House, a derelict James Gandon-designed 19th-century farmhouse in the townland of Coldblow west of Lucan. Her clothes were found scattered in the house. Her death was caused by blunt force injuries, and bloodied pieces of wood were found in the house. There were also signs of sexual assault.

Two boys, both aged 13, immediately came under suspicion. As minors, their names could not be published; they were granted lifelong anonymity at their trial, and are known in reports as Boy A and Boy B.

Both were charged with murder, the youngest people in the history of Ireland to face this charge; Boy A was additionally charged with aggravated sexual assault. Both charges carry potential life sentences for adults, but these are not mandatory for children. Their trial began in the Central Criminal Court on 29 April 2019.

=== Murder verdict ===
The two accused were found guilty of murder on 18 June 2019, after the jury deliberated for over fourteen hours. After the verdict, Justice Paul McDermott thanked the jury members and relieved them from jury duty for the rest of their lives.

Prosecuting counsel said there were places available at Oberstown Children Detention Campus. The judge remanded them in custody and adjourned sentencing to 15 July; it was further adjourned to October for psychological assessments to be made.

A number of posts appeared on social media platforms including Twitter and Facebook that identified the two boys, violating a court order. An injunction was served on the platforms to remove the posts.

=== Sentencing ===
Sentencing took place on 5 November 2019. Boy A was sentenced to life imprisonment for Ana's murder, with a review after twelve years, and to twelve years, running concurrently, for aggravated sexual assault. Boy B was sentenced to fifteen years for Ana's murder, to be reviewed after eight years. Outside the court, Ana's father Patric said "forever is not long enough" in response to the sentences. The boys will be offered new identities after release. Patric Kriégel died on 19 June 2022.

=== Incarceration ===
The boys were both held in the Oberstown Detention Centre in North Dublin until 2022 and transferred to an adult prison upon turning 18. In May 2020, Boy A, then aged 15, was assaulted by fellow inmates, suffering minor injuries.

== Tributes and public reaction ==
Ana Kriégel's funeral took place on 31 May 2018 at Newlands Cross Crematorium, Dublin. Her family requested that mourners wear "sparkle and colour" in Ana's memory and that donations be made to the Russian Irish Adoption Group. A Russian flag and matryoshka doll were placed on her coffin.

A charity to help other teenagers was set up in her honour by Ana's family with the Russian Irish Adoption Group (RIAG), and called ANA (Ana's Network of Adolescents).

Denise Fergus, the mother of James Bulger, expressed concern about the decision not to name Ana's killers.

== See also ==
- List of solved missing person cases (post-2000)
- Murder of Cameron Blair
- Murder of Craig Sorger
- Murder of James Bulger
