= Cameron Blair =

Cameron Blair may refer to:

- Cameron Blair (rugby league) (born 1966), Australian rugby league footballer
- Cameron Blair (1999–2020), Irish man who was fatally stabbed, see murder of Cameron Blair
