= Loughan House =

Detention centre in Blacklion, County Cavan, Ireland

Loughan House Open Centre
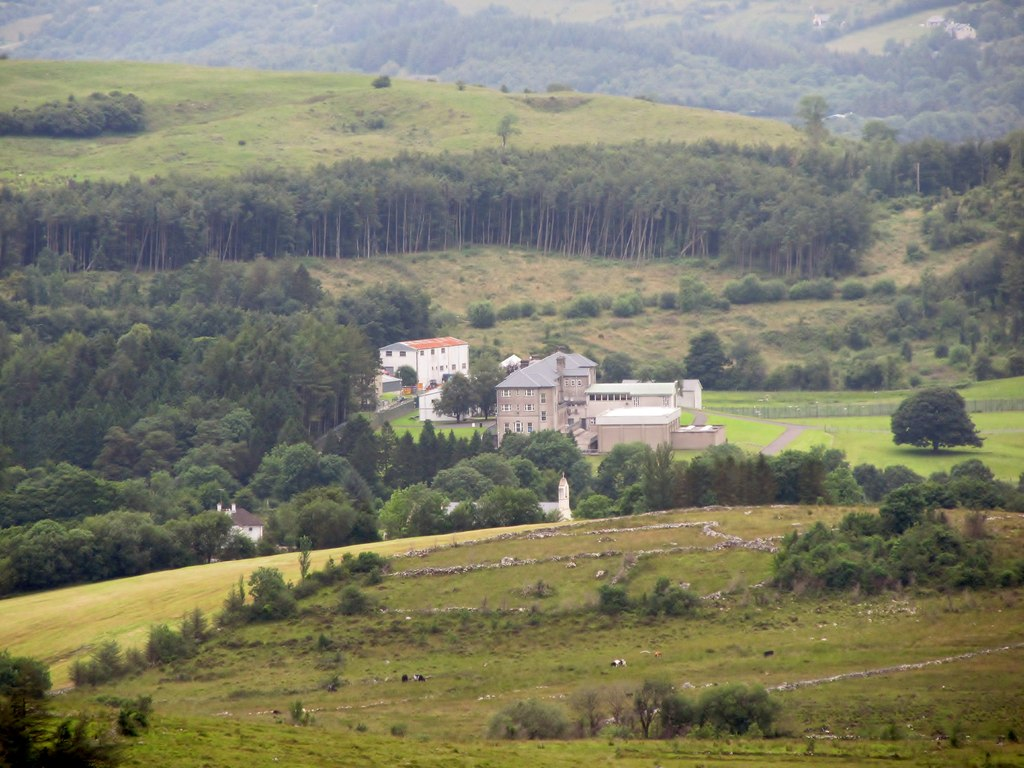

- Location within Ireland
- Location: Blacklion, County Cavan; 54°17′17″N 7°55′13″W
- Status: Operational
- Security class: Open prison
- Capacity: 140
- Opened: 1972
- Managed by: Irish Prison Service
- Governor: Mr. Eddie Mullins

Loughan House Open Centre (/lɒkˈæn/; Irish: Teach an Locháin) is a low-security, open detention centre in Blacklion, County Cavan, Ireland. It was purchased by the Department of Justice in 1972 to be converted to a prison facility. It is low security, and caters for male inmates.

Its current governor is Mr Mark Lydon. It is run by the Irish Prison Service.

== History ==
Purpose-built in 1953 as a novitiate for the White Fathers Missionary Congregation, it was opened in September 1955 and closed in 1970, with the remaining students enrolling in University College Dublin. After it was purchased by the Department of Justice, it was renamed Loughan House.

== Accommodation ==
The centre has an operational capacity of 140 adult male inmates who have been deemed suitable for residency in an open centre. It has a mix of single and shared rooms. All rooms are equipped with televisions.

== Healthcare and Welfare Services ==
The centre houses a medical surgery with trained staff, which is available from 8 am to 8 pm each day. Outside these hours, a doctor is available. Serious medical emergencies are dealt with at Sligo University Hospital. A visiting dentist is also available.

Psychiatrists are available on call, and a Probation and Welfare Service officer is on duty from Tuesday to Friday each week.

An alcohol education programme exists and is delivered to suitable offenders.

== Prisoner facilities ==
Various workshops are available in the centre, and operate on a voluntary basis. Computer facilities are provided to allow inmates to develop skills in that area. A gymnasium and volleyball alley are available for recreation.

== Visits ==
Prisoners may be visited on any day of the year from 10am to 5pm. The visiting facilities are designed to be family friendly, and visitors can usually bring items to the centre to give to the inmates (once they have been examined to ensure that they do not contain any prohibited items such as drugs or alcohol).

== Notable inmates ==
- Luke 'Ming' Flanagan
- Andy "The Bull" McSharry
- Thomas "Slab" Murphy

== See also ==
- Prisons in Ireland
