= McSharry =

McSharry is a surname. Notable people with the surname include:

- Andy "The Bull" McSharry, Irish sheep farmer
- Carmel McSharry (1926–2018), Irish actor
- Dave McSharry (born 1990), Irish rugby union player
- Louise McSharry (born 1982), Irish broadcaster and disc jockey
- Mona McSharry (born 2000), Irish swimmer

== See also ==
- MacSharry, surname
