= Midlands Prison =

Irish Prison

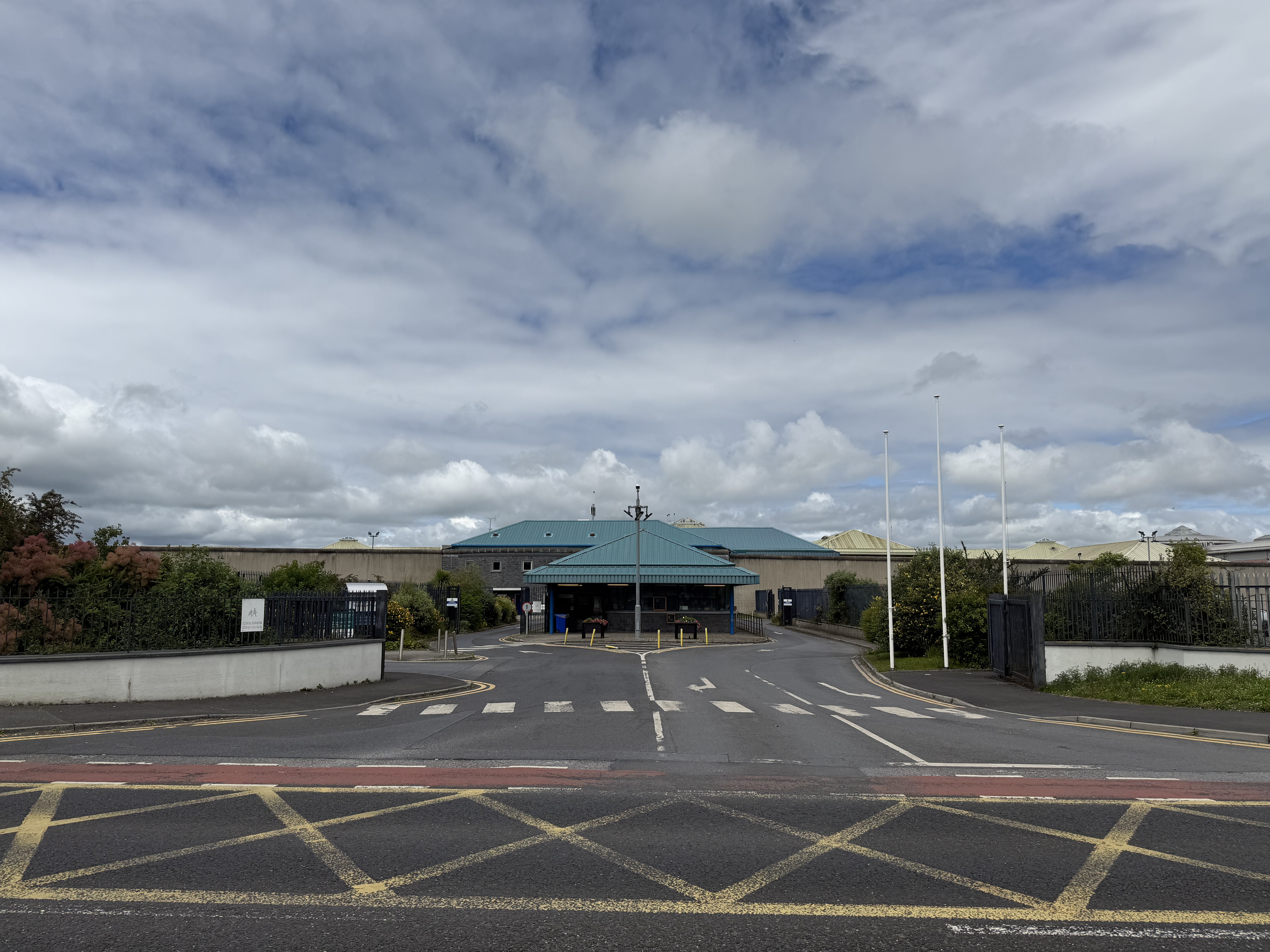

- Location within Ireland
- Location: Dublin Road, Portlaoise, County Laois; 53°2′13.57″N 7°17′20.9″W
- Status: Operational
- Security class: Medium Security
- Capacity: 870
- Population: 800 (2021)
- Opened: 2000
- Managed by: Irish Prison Service
- Governor: Dave Conroy

The Midlands Prison (Irish: Príosún Lár na Tíre) is a medium security prison in Portlaoise, County Laois. It receives prisoners who are aged 17 years and over. It has a bed capacity of 870 and its daily average number of inmates resident in 2009 was 512.

== History ==
The Midlands Prison was built adjacent to Portlaoise Prison with which it shares some facilities. It was built as a public-private partnership at a cost of £46 million (Irish pounds). It opened in 2000 with an operational capacity of 875 inmates. It is a committal prison as all prisoners resident have been transferred from other prisons. A very small number of prisoners in the resident population are awaiting trial but the vast majority of prisoners have already been sentenced. It typically receives prisoners with home addresses in counties Carlow, Kildare, Kilkenny, Laois, Meath, Monaghan, Offaly, Westmeath, Wexford and Wicklow. As of 2022, the daily average number in custody was 861 prisoners.

== See also ==
- Prisons in Ireland
- Portlaoise Prison
