= Benjamin Jacob (priest) =

Anglican priest

Benjamin Jacob was an Anglican priest in Ireland in the 19th century.

Peacocke was born in Kilkenny and educated at Trinity College, Dublin. He was the incumbent at Caherconlish then Chaplain of Limerick Prison. He was Archdeacon of Limerick from 1881 until 1883.
