= Training Unit =

Prison in Dublin, Ireland

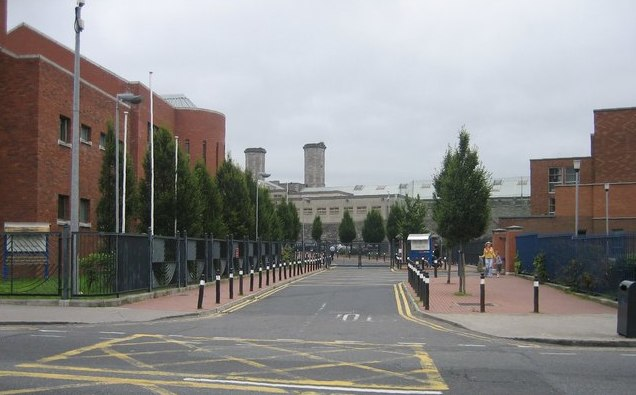

- Location in Central Dublin
- Location: Phibsborough, Dublin; 53.362357°N 6.265941°W
- Status: Operational
- Security class: Low security
- Capacity: 96
- Population: 112 (2009)
- Opened: 1974
- Managed by: Irish Prison Service
- Governor: Brian Murphy

The Training Unit (Irish: Ionad Traenála) is a semi-open, low security prison located on the grounds of the Mountjoy Prison campus in Dublin 7. It receives prisoners eighteen years of age and over and is designed to provide industrial training to inmates prior to the release. It has an official bed capacity of 107 and in 2009 its daily average number of inmates resident was 112.

== History ==
The Training Unit was built on part of the grounds of Mountjoy Prison between 1973 and 1974. It received its first prisoner in August 1975. The object of the Training Unit is to facilitate prisoners finding employment upon release by providing education and industrial training. It is a semi-open prison. There are no bars on the bedroom windows, prisoners may move about from area to area without being accompanied by prison staff and they each have a key to their own rooms. Staff, however, retain a masterkey to all the rooms.

== See also ==
- Prisons in Ireland
- Mountjoy Prison
