= Administrative detention =

Arrest and detention of individuals by the state without trial

Administrative detention is arrest and detention of individuals by the state without trial. A number of jurisdictions claim that it is done for security reasons. Many countries claim to use administrative detention as a means to combat terrorism or rebellion, to control illegal immigration, or to otherwise protect the ruling regime.

In a number of jurisdictions, unlike criminal incarceration (imprisonment) imposed upon conviction following a trial, administrative detention is a forward-looking mechanism. While criminal proceedings have a retrospective focus – they seek to determine whether a defendant committed an offense in the past – the reasoning behind administrative detention often is based upon contentions that the suspect is likely to pose a threat in the future. It is meant to be preventive in nature rather than punitive (see preventive detention). The practice has been criticized by human rights organizations as a breach of civil and political rights.

In other jurisdictions it is retrospective, i.e., it is a form of punishment for a certain category of offenses.

== Counter-terrorism ==
Administrative detentions are defined in the law of many of the world's states. In democratic countries using administrative detention as a counter-terrorism measure, the rationale given by its proponents is that legal existing systems are ill-suited to handle the specific challenges presented by terrorism. Proponents of administrative detention maintain that criminal law's reliance on defendant rights and strict rules of evidence cannot be used effectively to remove the threat of dangerous terrorists. Some of the reasons often used to support this claim are that the information used to identify terrorists and their plots may include extremely sensitive intelligence sources and methods, the disclosure of which during trial would undermine future counter-terrorism operations. It is also claimed that the conditions under which some suspected terrorists are captured, especially in combat zones, make it impossible to prove criminal cases using normal evidentiary rules. Proponents also maintain that criminal prosecution is designed primarily to punish past behavior, thus it is deliberately skewed in favor of defendant, in order to assure that few, if any, innocents are punished. Counter-terrorism, on the other hand, aims to prevent future action, and thus requires a system that is weighed more heavily toward reducing the possibility of future harm, by ensuring that no guilty party will go free.

The Laws of War are also seen by the proponents as inadequate. These laws allow the capture of enemy fighters, and also allow holding them for the duration of hostilities without trial. However, these laws grew out of the need to regulate combat between professional armies accountable to a sovereign state, who were engaged in combat of possibly lengthy, but finite duration. Attempting to apply these laws to terrorists who are intermingled with a civilian population and accountable to no-one opens the possibility of indefinite detention without trial, combined with a substantial likelihood of error.

Opponents of administrative detention challenge the above assumptions. While acknowledging the need to protect the sources and methods used to obtain sensitive intelligence, they maintain that existing laws, such as the Foreign Intelligence Surveillance Act (FISA) and the Classified Information Procedures Act (CIPA), successfully balance the need to protect sensitive information, including the sources and means of intelligence gathering, with defendants' fair trial rights. They point to the historical record of prosecutors who were able to obtain convictions against terrorists on the basis of existing laws. Opponents maintain that in essence, administrative detention is a form of collective punishment. Since it does not require proof of individual guilt, it attributes to all members of a group the actions of a few.

== Immigration control ==
Many countries utilize administrative detention to hold illegal immigrants – those arriving at a country's borders without proper authorization – as an interim step to either deportation or the obtainment of proper legal status. Immigration detention is controversial because it presents a clash between traditional notions of individual liberty and the territorial sovereignty of states. Comparative studies on administrative detention practices of different countries found that those experiencing large-scale influxes of illegal migrants by sea (such as the United States and Australia) typically have the most draconian systems. Proponents of administrative detention for illegal immigrants claim that detention is required since these immigrants have not committed any crime for which they could be prosecuted under existing laws, and that allowing them to await their potential deportation while not in custody runs a risk of their absconding. Opponents maintain that alternatives to detention exist, and that such alternatives are preferable because they do not violate personal liberty, as well as being less of a financial burden to the state. Among the alternatives suggested are supervised release to a non-governmental organization (NGO), the release into the custody of a private citizen who will guarantee the immigrant's participation in immigration hearings, and "open detention" centers with mandatory reporting requirements.

== Protection of the ruling regime ==
Administrative detention is used by the ruling regime to suppress dissent and sanction opponents of the government. In Asia in particular, administrative detention was first introduced by the British and French colonial authorities prior to and during World War II. Created as a mechanism to control political dissent, it has ironically survived and made its way into the law books of the now-independent former colonies, who legitimized its use against their own political opponents in their constitutions. In many cases, they were and are codified as "emergency measures" or "internal security" acts. Bangladesh, India, Malaysia, Myanmar, Pakistan, Singapore and Sri Lanka are notable examples of such former colonies who hold political prisoners under administrative detention which has its legal roots in British colonial practices. Vietnam is an example where administrative detention was widely used by the French colonial authorities in the 1930s, to arrest those suspected of Communist activities. Post-independence, the now-ruling Communist authorities have employed very similar means to detain those suspected of "counter-revolutionary" offenses. Some of these political prisoners, such as Aung San Suu Kyi in Myanmar, have become known worldwide due to the detention, and their cause is championed by human rights organizations.

== Instances ==
=== Armenia ===
Armenia has been criticized by Human Rights Watch for not fully reforming the legal framework it inherited from the former Soviet Union, and failing to bring its administrative detention system into accord with prevailing international norms. During the 2003 Presidential elections, Armenian police arbitrarily applied the Code of Administrative Offenses, under which administrative detention is authorized, to lock up dozens of opposition activists and supporters for periods of up to fifteen days.

=== Australia ===
Like many other countries experiencing large scale illegal immigration, such as Canada and the United States, Australia has a system of mandatory administrative detention for illegal immigrants, or asylum seekers who arrive at its shores without proper visas. The legal basis for this system is found in Australia's Migration Act 1958 (Cth), which authorized the indefinite detention of an unlawful non-citizen who can not be deported immediately. Human Rights Watch criticized this Australian policy, claiming it seriously contravenes Australia's obligations to non-citizens, refugees and asylum seekers under international human rights and refugee law. Additionally, opposition to the system on humanitarian grounds came from a range of religious, community and political groups including the National Council of Churches in Australia, Amnesty International, the Australian Greens and Rural Australians for Refugees.

=== Brazil ===
Administrative detentions in Brazil are admitted only for members of the military. Any member of the Brazilian Armed Forces may be imprisoned if found to be repeatedly in violation of the Military Disciplinary Regulations (Regulamento Disciplinar) by his or her superiors. Each military branch has issued a list of "transgressions" in their Disciplinary Regulations. The harshest punishment of this kind, in the Brazilian Army, is a 30-day imprisonment penalty.

Notwithstanding, members of the Brazilian Armed Forces under administrative detention may be granted a habeas corpus by the justice system to deliver them from imprisonment. They retain their full rights as citizens.

=== China ===
The use of administrative detention in China has been commonplace since before 1949. At that time, it was used primarily against minor offenders as well as against opium addicts, prostitutes, vagrants and those considered to be insane. Since the 1978 legal reforms in China, the public security departments (gong'an jiguan), primarily the police, hold administrative detention powers which are used alongside the state's criminal justice system. Administrative detention is used against subjects that are viewed by the ruling regime as "socially undesirable", in order to maintain public order, social stability and political stability of the ruling regime. There is a well-established history of forced labour, arbitrary arrest and detention of minority groups, including: Falun Gong members, Tibetans, Muslim minorities, political prisoners and other groups. In the case of the Falun Gong in particular, there have been claims of extraordinary abuses of human rights in concentration camps, including organ harvesting and systematic torture. This target group includes prostitutes and their clients, drug addicts, political dissenters and petty criminals, who perform legal misdemeanors that are not serious enough for criminal prosecution. Custody and repatriation (Chinese: 收容遣送; pinyin: shōuróng qiǎnsòng) was also used until 2003 for people, especially peasants, who did not have required papers.

There are three main forms of these administrative detentions: "detention for education" ("Shourong jiaoyu"), coercive drug rehabilitation ("Qiangzhi jiedu"), and "reeducation through labor" ("Laodong jiaoyang"). In addition, administrative detention is used for several internal security reasons, such as detention under the Security Administrative Punishments Law ("Xingzheng juliu"); Administrative detention for questioning of suspects ("Luizhi panwen"); and detention of juvenile offenders in work-study schools ("Gongdu Xuexiao").

In recent years, government policy has been marked by mass surveillance and the incarceration without trial of over one million Uyghurs and other Muslim minority ethnic groups in "re-education camps", supposedly for 'anti-terrorist' purposes. Numerous reports have stated that many of these minorities have been used in prison labour in a seeming return to the "re-education through labour" program, supposedly abolished in 2013. As of May 2020, the last terrorist attack was in 2014, before the concentration camps were established.

Under the Security Administrative Punishments Law, the administrative detention in China for misdemeanors for up to twenty days. Teenager of sixteen years old or less and women who are pregnant or feeding an infant less than one years old are exempt. Teenager aged sixteen to eighteen are exempt from their first misdemeanor. Administrative detention shall be signed and approved by the administrative responsible person (ie, director) of the public security agency at the county level and above, and shall be executed in the administrative detention facility under the public security agency. Those who are dissatisfied with the detention may initiate administrative reconsideration and administrative litigation. According to the decision of the Standing Committee of the National People's Congress, the Chinese national security agency and People's Armed Police has also been granted the power to enforce administrative detention penalties.

The use of administrative detention in China has been criticized by international human rights organizations, as well as by domestic groups. These criticisms maintain that the police often abuse their power, that the execution of these powers is at the complete discretion of the police, and that there are no legal constraints placed on their execution.

=== Egypt ===
Egypt's Emergency Law No. 162 of 1958 authorizes the government to suspend basic civil liberties by declaring a state of emergency. Such a state of emergency has been in force almost continuously since 1967. Acting under this law, Egyptian authorities have administratively detained individuals who were suspected of membership in banned organizations such as the Muslim Brotherhood, as well as individuals engaged in peaceful demonstrations expressing opposition to the war in Iraq or support for the Palestinian uprising. Human Rights Watch has criticized this practice as the use of emergency legislation for 'repression of public dissent'. Amnesty International charges that relatives of political prisoners in Egypt have been administratively detained solely because of their family relationship. The Egyptian government refuses to disclose how many administrative detainees are held, but human rights groups estimate that 16,000–20,000 are held in detention without charge.

=== India ===
India's National Security Act of 1980 empowers the Central Government and State Governments to detain a person to prevent him/her from acting in any manner prejudicial to the security of India, the relations of India with foreign countries, the maintenance of public order, or the maintenance of supplies and services essential to the community it is necessary so to do. The act also gives power to the governments to detain a foreigner in a view to regulate his presence or expel from the country. The act was passed in 1980 during the Indira Gandhi Government. The maximum period of detention is 12 months. The order can also be made by the District Magistrate or a Commissioner of Police under their respective jurisdictions, but the detention should be reported to the State Government along with the grounds on which the order has been made. The National Security Act along with other laws allowing preventive detention have come under wide criticism for their alleged misuse. The act's constitutional validity even during peacetime has been described by some sections as an anachronism.

=== Ireland ===
Ireland utilizes administrative detention to control illegal immigration. Beginning in 1996, a legal framework was put in place to authorize the use of administrative detention for this purpose. This legal framework includes the Refugee Act, 1996, the Immigration Acts, 1999, 2003 and 2004, and the Illegal Immigrants (Trafficking) Act 2000. According to official Irish government statistics, in 2003–2004, a total of 2,798 people were administratively detained for immigration-related reasons, two thirds of whom were held in prison for periods of longer than 51 days. The vast majority (more than 90%) of detainees are held in one of two Dublin prisons, Cloverhill Prison (male detainees) and the Dóchas Centre at Mountjoy Prison (female detainees). The rest are held in prisons as well as border control (Garda Síochána) stations.

The Council of Europe and human rights organizations have criticized the overcrowded conditions in which the detainees are held, as well as the fact that detainees are held together with convicted criminals. In addition, Human Rights Consultants have reported that Irish law does not protect the rights of detainees, by not informing them of their right to challenge the legality of their detention, nor recognizing their rights to have access to a lawyer and to have access to medical care.

=== Israel ===
The legal basis for Israel's use of administrative detention is the British Mandate 1945 Defence (Emergency) Regulations, which were amended in 1979 to form the Israeli Law on Authority in States of Emergency. Administrative detention is for six-month terms, although they can be extended barring appeal. Administrative detention is also used in cases where the available evidence consists of information obtained by the security services (particularly the Shin Bet), and where a trial would reveal sensitive security information, such as the identities of informers or infiltrators.

Although it is commonly applied to alleged Palestinian political activists, it has also been applied to a few Jewish Israeli citizens, including Jewish right-wing public-figures and activists (notably in the aftermath of the assassination of Yitzhak Rabin) and in more recent years sometimes to settlers for short periods.

Within Israel, the Minister of Defense has the authority to issue administrative detention orders for up to 6 months in cases where there is a reasonable chance that the person harms the security of the state. The same officeholder has the authority to renew such orders. Likewise, the Chief of the General Staff can issue such orders, but valid for only 48 hours. Law enforcement authorities have to show cause within 48 hours (in a hearing behind closed doors). Administrative detention orders can be appealed to the district court and, if denied there, to the Supreme Court of Israel. The District Court can annul such orders if it finds the administrative detention occurred for reasons other than security (mainly for common crimes or the exercise of freedom of expression). Overall supervisory authority on the application of the relevant law rests with the Minister of Justice.

Persons held in administrative detention must be brought before a military judge within eight days – either of the original detention order or of its extension, a requirement established by the Supreme Court in 2003 in a case brought by the Association for Civil Rights in Israel (ACRI) together with B'Tselem, Adalah, and other Israeli human rights organizations against the IDF's earlier practice of holding detainees without judicial review for up to eighteen days. The judge may uphold the order, reject it, or shorten the period of detention stipulated in it. Both the detainee and the military commander may appeal this decision to the Military Court of Appeals, and thereafter, to the High Court of Justice.

Within the West Bank and Gaza Strip, any Israeli district army commander can issue an administrative detention order, and the order can be appealed at the Israeli district military court, or, if denied there, at the Supreme Court. Here too, an administrative detention order is valid for at most six months, but can be renewed by the appropriate authority. Israel refers its use of administrative detention in the occupied territories to Article 78 of the Fourth Geneva Convention 1949, which states that "If the Occupying Power considers it necessary, for imperative reasons of security, to take safety measures concerning protected persons, it may, at the most, subject them to assigned residence or to internment."

In the early days of the occupation, administrative detention was used in the Gaza Strip to detain youths who were unemployed and not engaged in study, even if there was no suspicion against them. In 1971, they were sent to a remote internment camp in the Sinai Desert and told they could be released if they found work in the West Bank.

Number of detainees in Israel under administrative detention

According to Addameer, Israel held 285 Palestinians in administrative detention in June 2012. Eighteen of them were members of parliament, out of 4,706 prisoners. According to B'Tselem, as of April 2012, about 308 Palestinians were being held under administrative detention by the Israel Prisons Service (IPS), and statistics on those held by the IDF were unavailable. According to IPS figures for December 2012, 178 Palestinians were being held in administrative detention (without charge or trial). As of December 2013, B'Tselem reported that 140 Palestinians were being held under administrative detention by the IPS.

In August 2015, the Israeli Government approved the usage of administrative detention against Jewish settler suspects to curb the increasing number of "price tag" attacks.

As of August 2022, more than 700 persons were held in administrative detention, all of them Palestinian including 7 Israeli citizens.

On 2 May 2023, Khader Adnan died following an 87-day hunger strike while in administrative detention for the 12th time.

As of the beginning of February 2024, there were 3,484 Palestinians under administrative detention according to The Times of Israel, citing an article of Haaretz.

=== Japan ===
In Japan, immigration detention is a form of administration detention under the Immigration Control and Refugee Recognition Act, Act No. 319 of 1951 (ICRRA). Minors and asylum seekers can also be subject to administrative detention.

Another type of administrative detention in Japan (see ja:勾留) is under Code of Criminal Procedure, individuals suspected of a crime may be held for up to 23 days without being formally charged. The duration of detention, within this limit, is determined by the public prosecutor and must be approved by local courts.

=== Jordan ===
The Crime Prevention Law (No. 7 of 1954) in Jordan authorizes administrative detention. Authority resides with Jordan's provincial governors and the administrators of provincial subdivisions. The law allows the detention of anyone "about to commit a crime or to assist in its commission", people who "'habitually' steal, shelter thieves, or fence stolen goods" or anyone deemed to present "a danger to the people" if they are not detained. According to Jordan's National Centre for Human Rights, administrative detention was used in 11,870 cases in 2008, 16,050 in 2009, 12,345 in 2010, and 11,345 in 2011. The law does not provide for independent or court review of the administrative detention decisions although detainees can petition the High Court of Justice. Women who were at risk of violence, honor killing, by family members were administratively detained even though the Crime Prevention Law does not provide a legal basis for that. The use of the law in this way has been criticized by the United Nations and Human Rights Watch. In 2007, the government opened the Wifaq Center for women at risk of violence, and in 2008, women who had been in protective custody were transferred from prison to the center, although the practice of sending women to prison for "protective custody" using the Crime Prevention Law has not completely ceased. In 2018 the government completely abolished the practice by establishing Dar Amneh and transferring endangered women to the center without restricting their freedom.

=== Myanmar ===
In an overview that describes Myanmar as "one of the most repressive countries in Asia", Human Rights Watch quotes a Red Cross report that states that in 2002, there were approximately 3,500 detainees in Myanmar, of which 1,300 are political prisoners, including parliament members. Burmese authorities often extend the detention of prisoners who have already served their prison sentences, by placing them under administrative detention. This practice is used even with elderly and infirm prisoners. One of the most notable cases of this practice was the detention of Aung San Suu Kyi.

=== Russia ===
Administrative detention in Russia is incarceration for grave administrative offenses according to Code of the Russian Federation on Administrative Offenses.

=== Switzerland ===
Administrative detention was practiced in Switzerland from the mid-19th century until 1981, involving the deprivation of liberty in institutions ordered by cantonal administrative authorities for typically indefinite periods. The practice was based on cantonal administrative law and, from 1912, federal guardianship law, requiring neither criminal offense nor judicial procedure. Personal liberty was restricted based on individuals' lifestyles and perceived threats to public order.

The system emerged as a response to mass poverty and overwhelmed assistance systems, initially targeting those stigmatized as "lazy" or "debauched." Administrative detention developed first in German-speaking Switzerland, with the Romansh cantons and Ticino following later with greater emphasis on alcoholism prevention. By World War II, all cantons except Geneva had implemented some form of administrative detention. The coexistence of cantonal and federal provisions created a complex patchwork of often vague legal frameworks that enabled arbitrary application and violations of fundamental rights.

An estimated 60,000 people were subjected to administrative detention in 20th-century Switzerland, with measures peaking between 1930 and 1945. The practice disproportionately affected marginalized populations including the poor, unemployed, single mothers, Yenish people, and individuals in conflict with authorities. About 80% of detainees were men, primarily accused of laziness or excessive drinking, while women were mainly detained for perceived sexual transgressions. Rather than promoting integration, the system reinforced social exclusion through stigmatization, interrupted employment, and poor institutional conditions including forced labor and frequent abuse.

International pressure from the Council of Europe and the International Labour Organization, which classified the measures as prohibited forced labor, led to fundamental reform. In 1981, administrative detention was abolished and replaced with "deprivation of liberty for assistance purposes" under revised civil law with improved legal protections. A comprehensive rehabilitation process began in 2014 when Parliament adopted legislation recognizing the injustice suffered, establishing an Independent Expert Commission for historical analysis, and providing financial compensation to survivors.

=== Syria ===
Legislative Decree No. 51 of 22 December 1962 introduced the State of Emergency Law, which came into force on 8 March 1963, that allowed the security forces to hold suspects in preventive detention without judicial oversight for indefinite periods.

=== United Kingdom ===
The United Kingdom has maintained many forms of administrative detention over the years. The most recent forms were a series of Acts intended to introduce a form of administrative detention to Northern Ireland under the auspices of the Prevention of Terrorism (Temporary Provisions) Act 1974. This Act allowed the security forces to apprehend and detain persons suspected of terrorist activities without trial for an unlimited period. The introduction of the Act led directly to the creation of internment camps (particularly Long Kesh (the Maze) and the prison ship HMS Maidstone where suspects were detained, some for protracted periods. The Act of 1974 was amended a number of times during the late 20th and early 21st century, the most recent incarnation being the Prevention of Terrorism Act 2005 which introduced the concept of the control order, itself a more politically palatable means of limiting the freedom of a suspect without the need to provide a court of law with prima facie evidence of any wrongdoing.

=== United States ===
The United States currently uses indefinite detention without trial—known under various names as internment, civil commitment, preventive detention or administrative detention—to hold people who fall within a few narrow categories, including the mentally ill (involuntary commitment) and "sexually violent predators", though the right of habeas corpus still applies, and some determinations regarding mental illness and sexual dangerousness are made by juries.

During World War II, the United States detained over 100,000 Japanese Americans in internment camps; smaller numbers of German Americans and Italian Americans were interned. The constitutionality of Japanese internment was controversially upheld by the Supreme Court's 1944 decision in Korematsu v. United States, which has since been overturned.

The United States also utilizes administrative detention as a counter-terrorism measure, and as a means to control illegal immigration. There are approximately 100,000 persons in removal proceedings at any one time, and about 31,000 held in detention during these proceedings.

Following the September 11 attacks, the Patriot Act was passed. The Act expanded the authority of law enforcement agencies to use administrative detention for the stated purpose of fighting terrorism in the United States and abroad. Under the Act, any person (citizen or alien) suspected of terrorist connections may be administratively detained for up to seven days without the benefit of a habeas corpus proceeding. The Attorney General of the United States, at his discretion, may extend this seven-day period to six months, and this extension itself may be renewed indefinitely – legally creating the possibility of lifetime imprisonment without ever facing charges. One of the criticisms of the Patriot Act is that the Attorney General's decision is not subject to any judicial review, unlike the situation in other democratic countries which have similar administrative detention laws.

As part of the war on terror, and particularly during and after the War in Afghanistan, U.S. forces captured hundreds of alleged terrorists, who were subsequently detained without trial at the Guantanamo Bay detention camp. The United States initially refused to grant these detainees prisoner of war status, holding that they were illegal enemy combatants because they did not meet the requirements set down by the Third Geneva Convention. Of the 775 detainees incarcerated at Guantanamo, 420 have been released without charge, and only one has been tried and convicted. U.S. authorities claim that they intend to put 60 to 80 more on trial.

== Criticism by human rights groups ==
Administrative detention practices have come under severe criticism, with critics claiming that it breaches human rights. Amnesty International believes that administrative detention breaches Article 9 of the International Covenant on Civil and Political Rights (ICCPR) which "makes clear that no-one should be subjected to arbitrary detention and that deprivation of liberty must be based on grounds and procedures established by law". The ICCPR does allow a government, under narrow circumstances, such as a public emergency threatening the life of a nation, to temporarily derogate from its obligation not to engage in arbitrary detention.

Amnesty International is also concerned that prisoners of conscience are being "held solely for the non-violent exercise of their right to freedom of expression and association".

The United Nations has created the Working Group on Arbitrary Detention on the issue. One of the issues the group has focused on is the determination whether a detention is arbitrary or not – which is not as clear-cut in the case of administrative detention as it is in the case of criminal arrest. The group has proposed certain guidelines to aid in such determination. For example, it has suggested that any deprivations of liberty that violate the freedom of association must be deemed arbitrary. Based on these guidelines, the group has condemned countries who have used long-term administrative detention when the detainees were held for the mere fact of belonging to an "illegal organization".

== See also ==
- Arbitrary arrest and detention
- Civil commitment
- Civil confinement
- Forced disappearance
- Indefinite imprisonment
- Pre-crime
- Preemptive arrest
- Preventive detention
