= Oberstown Children Detention Campus =

Youth detention centre in north County Dublin, Ireland

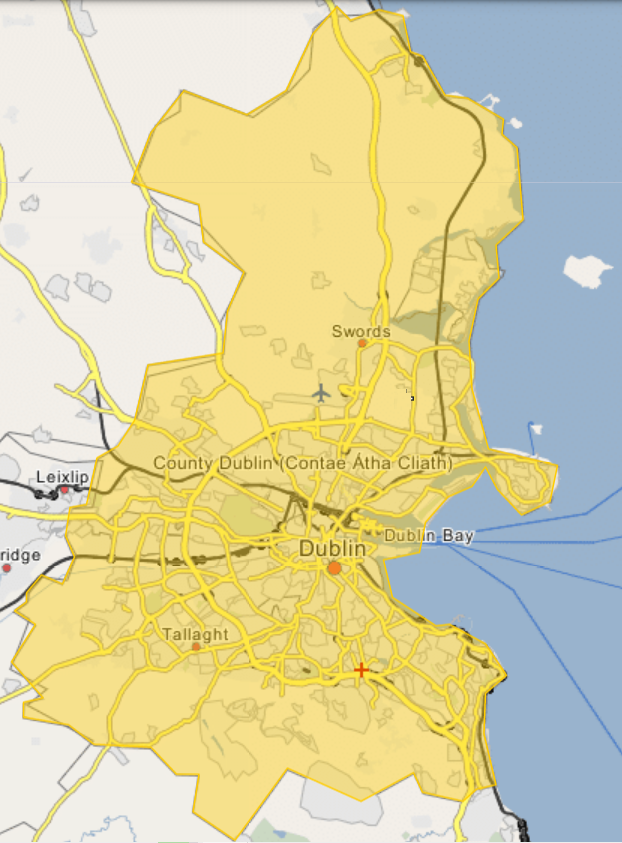
- Location in County Dublin
- Location: Leinster, Ireland; 53.555300°N 6.191041°W
- Status: Operational
- Security class: Children detention campus
- Capacity: 46
- Population: 39 (June 2025)
- Opened: 1983, 1991, 2016
- Managed by: Board of Management of Oberstown
- Director: Damien Hernon
- Website: oberstown.com

Oberstown Children Detention Campus (/ˈoʊbərzˌtaʊn/; Irish: Campas Coinneála Leanaí Bhaile an Oibricigh) is a youth detention centre located in the north part of County Dublin (Fingal), Ireland. It was established under the Children Act, 2001, which is the primary statutory framework for the youth justice system. Oberstown is funded by the Irish Youth Justice Service (IYJS), in the Department of Children, Disability and Equality. It houses both male and female offenders.

== History ==
The Oberstown campus, near Lusk in North County Dublin, was previously home to three semi-independent detention schools; Trinity House Reformatory School, a high-security institution, was opened in 1983 and Oberstown Boys School and Oberstown Girls School, which opened in 1991. Beginning in 2013, works were undertaken to construct six new up-to-date residential units along with education and administration buildings. The development of the site concluded in 2015. Following a government commitment to end the imprisonment of children under 18 years, three schools merged in June 2016 to become Oberstown Children Detention Campus, which is now the sole place of detention in Ireland for those under the age of 18.

In 2016, a riot led to a major fire and the deployment of armed gardaí.

In 2017, two offenders escaped after attacking a staff member with a crowbar. They were quickly recaptured.

In May 2018, President Michael D Higgins and his wife Sabina Higgins visited Oberstown to present Gaisce awards to four young people. The young people also presented the President and his wife with portraits and had their Gaisce certificates signed by the President.

In May 2020, "Boy A", one of the murderers of Ana Kriegel, was assaulted by other residents.

In 2022, young people at Oberstown created The Ride Away from the Storm exhibition, as part of their Gaisce Award work. The paintings were created specifically to be shown at IMMA and were on display from April 26 to May 8 2022. The exhibition was launched by Minister Roderic O'Gorman. The paintings were created over a period of six months in the art room in the Oberstown Campus School. The project also involved the young people and their art teachers working on a citizen curation programme, which was part of IMMA's contribution to Sustainable Public Spaces through Inclusive Community Engagement (SPICE), a European research project.

In March 2024, Oberstown young people and artist Joe Caslin unveiled murals at the Balbriggan Garda Station. The street art project was built from conversations between Gardai, young people at Oberstown and Gaisce - The President's Award. The "Outreach" mural was installed at Balbriggan Garda Station and a second 200 metre mural, "Breath of Fresh Éire", was installed at the Balbriggan Rugby Club. The work was completed as part of the young people's Gaisce Award work, and it was facilitated through seven workshops led by Joe Caslin.

== Facilities ==
Oberstown is a secure facility for the detention and care of young people in Ireland. The Children Act 2001 strictly prohibits the imprisonment of individuals under 18 years old. In line with legal requirements, the model of care is built around "care, education, health, offending behaviour, and preparation for leaving."

The campus health suite offers medical and health service to the young people. Staff nurses are supported by a visiting GP, dentist, physiotherapist, optician, and podiatrist. The campus also hosts Tusla ACTS (Assessment Consultation Therapy Service), which includes a speech language therapist and psychologist. The National Forensic Mental Health Service also provide psychiatric care on site.

There is one school on campus, the Oberstown Campus School, which offers a varied primary, secondary and vocational curriculum delivered by the Dublin and Dún Laoghaire Education and Training Board. The young people attend classes between 9:15am and 3:30pm. Term times follow the national educational calendar. Each young person follows an educational programme tailored to their individual academic and social needs. The school offers the national curriculum, QQI certification, and learning support programmes. In 2024, the school supported two Leaving Certificate students, six Junior Cycle students, and the completion of 27 QQI modules.

About one-fifth of residents are Irish Travellers, while 71% have substance misuse issues.

After release, residents return to the community, either living with their families or are placed in the care of the Child and Family Agency. Those serving long sentences are transferred to adult prisons at the age of 18 1/2. In 2024, there were 120 young people detained on remand or detention orders. From these, there were 96 onwards placements: 65 returned home, 9 went to residential care, 13 to the Irish Prison Service, and 9 onward placements were listed as 'Other'.

== Notable residents ==
Due to laws protecting juvenile offenders, residents can in general not be publicly named.

- "Boy A" and "Boy B", teenage murderers of Ana Kriégel
- The murderer of Lorcan O'Reilly
- Stephen Egan, murderer of Gary Douch

== See also ==
- Prisons in Ireland
