= MacSharry =

MacSharry is a surname. Notable people with the surname include:

- Marc MacSharry (born 1973), Irish politician
- Ray MacSharry (born 1938), Irish politician

== See also ==
- McSharry
