= Paul McDermott (judge) =

Irish barrister, High Court judge since 2012

The Hon. Mr. Justice Paul McDermott

Judge of the High Court
- Incumbent
- Assumed office 7 June 2012
- Nominated by: Government of Ireland
- Appointed by: Michael D. Higgins

Personal details
- Born: 1959 (age 66–67)
- Education: University College Dublin; King's Inns

Paul McDermott (born 1959) is an Irish judge who has served as a Judge of the High Court since June 2012.

== Early life ==
McDermott attended University College Dublin and the King's Inns.

== Legal career ==
He became a barrister in 1980 and subsequently became a senior counsel in 1999. His practice was primarily focused on criminal law. He was counsel for the Morris Tribunal, which addressed allegations against the Garda Síochána. He received €3.2 million in fees, which was the highest amount paid to any of the tribunal's lawyers.

He is the author of legal texts on the Misuse of Drugs Act and the law of prisons in Ireland.

== Judicial career ==
McDermott was appointed to the High Court in June 2012. He has presided over cases affecting several areas of law, including judicial review, company law, personal injuries, extradition, medical negligence, and homicide trials. He was the presiding judge in the trial surrounding the murder of Ana Kriégel.

As of 2021, he is the judge in charge of several High Court lists including the Central Criminal Court, Special Criminal Court, Extradition, Criminal Assets Bureau and Bail lists.
