= Prisons in the Republic of Ireland =

Criminal detention facilities in Ireland

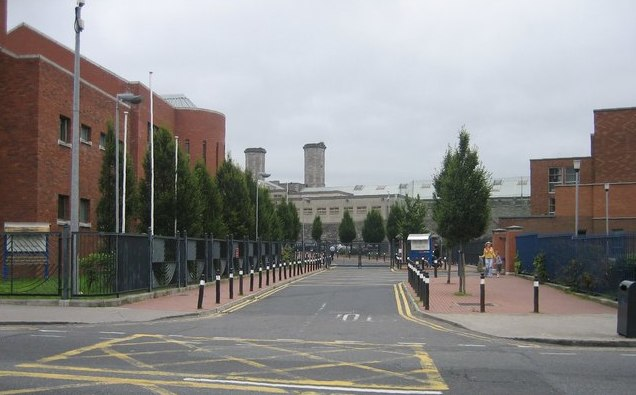
Mountjoy Campus, North Circular Road, Dublin 7, Ireland

Prisons in Ireland are one of the main forms of punishment, rehabilitation, or both for the commission of an indictable offense and other offenses.

== Authority ==
In 1925, shortly after the establishment of the Irish Free State, Minister for Justice, Kevin O'Higgins, introduced legislation repealing the existing ability of grand juries to appoint visiting committees to prisons within the state. Instead, the authority to appoint the members of prison visiting committees was vested solely in the person of the Minister. Similarly, the management of the prison system within the Irish Free State passed to the control of the minister with the dissolution by statutory instrument of the General Prisons Board for Ireland (the G.P.B.) in 1928. The G.P.B. had been an all-Ireland body. Thus, by this date, both the responsibility and control over the management and oversight of the prison service within the Irish Free State was held within the Minister's department.

This situation remained unchanged until 1999 when the Minister for Justice, Equality and Law Reform, John O'Donoghue, established the Irish Prison Service to which was delegated the task of managing the day-to-day running of the prison system. Simultaneously in 1999, a Prisons Authority Interim Board was established and its members were appointed by the Minister in 2000. The purpose of this board was to advise the director general and directors of the Irish Prison Service on the management of the penal system. In 2002 the retired High Court Judge, Dermot Kinlen, was appointed the state's first Inspector of Irish Prisons. However, none of these new bodies was ever established on a statutory basis despite indications to the contrary. Indeed, as recently as January 2011, Dermot Ahern informed the Dáil (Parliament) that:

I have no immediate plans to introduce legislation to place the Irish Prison Service or the Prisons Authority Interim Board on a statutory basis

In 2025, the Irish Prison Service had an annual budget of €525 million. As of year ending 2023 it had a staff of 3,547 people.

== EuroPris and the European Union ==
Ireland is a member of the European Union and the EuroPris system. Being a member of this system requires abolition of the death penalty and the provision of humane prison conditions. The goal of the Europris system is to ensure cooperation between European prison systems which aims to improve the lives of prisoner and their families, growing public safety and security, and reducing the re-offending rate.

== Prison services ==
The Irish prison system attempts to educate inmates and give them opportunities to avoid recidivism. The system provides multiple forms of education including vocational, life skills, basic education, healthy living, and technology education. The system also provides opioid addiction treatment facilities that covers at least 80% of the Irish prison population. They also ready the inmates for reintegration and resettlement back into society and provide mental health and health services for the inmates.

== Prison population rate ==
As of May 2025, the prison population in Ireland was 6,129 which is 115% of designed capacity which is 4,666. The service aims to open another 1500 beds. As of May 2025 the latest available official statistics are at year ending 2023. In January 2023, the incarceration rate was approximately 89 per 100,000 inhabitants.

The proportions in the prison population are: 15.8% are pre-trial and remand prisoners, 4.3% are females, and 12.3% of the prisoners are foreign.

== Prisons and prison population ==
There are 13 prisons in Ireland with a total bed capacity of 4,666 as of 16 May 2025 however, most of these prisons operate at or above capacity with the average capacity of a prison being 115%.

== Sentencing ==
In 2023 there were 6,495 committals to prisons in Ireland, which is an increase of 11.9% on 2022 when the equivalent figure was 5,801 committals.

== Cost of placement ==
The average cost to incarcerate a person in a prison in 2023 was €88,523 per annum. This was an increase of 5.3% on the 2022 cost which was €84,067.

== Active prisons ==
Prisons in Ireland: Operational Capacity and Daily Average Number of Prisoners in Custody 2023
Prison	Location	Year opened	Type	Security	Sentenced	Remand	Age Range	Special Features	Servicing Area of	Male Capacity	Female Capacity	Daily Average Number (Male)	Daily Average Number (Female)
Mountjoy Prison	Dublin 7	1850	Closed	Medium	✓	✓	18+	None	Dublin City	755	0	784	0
Dóchas Centre	Dublin 7	1999	Closed	Medium	✓	✓	18+	None	National (except Munster)	0	146	0	165
Training Unit	Dublin 7	1974	Semi-Open	Low	✓	✓	18+	Facility for older male inmates	National	96	0	95	0
Cork Prison	Cork City	2016	Closed	Medium	✓	✗	18+	None	Cork, Kerry, Waterford	296	0	306	0
Limerick Prison	Mulgrave Street, Limerick	1822 (Original Facility) 2023 (Modern Facilities)	Closed	Medium	✓	✓	18+	None	Males: Clare, Limerick, Tipperary. Females: Munster	286	56	293	49
Castlerea Prison	Castlerea, County Roscommon	1939 (Hospital) 1996 (Prison)	Closed	Medium	✓	✓	18+	None	Connacht, Cavan, Donegal, Longford	340	0	369	0
Cloverhill Prison	Cloverhill, Dublin 22	1999	Closed	Medium	✗	✓	18+	None	Leinster (primarily)	433	0	460	0
Wheatfield Prison	Cloverhill, Dublin 22	1989	Closed	Medium	✓	✗	18+	None	Louth, Meath, Monaghan, Wexford, Wicklow	610	0	571	0
Portlaoise Prison	Portlaoise, County Laois	1902	Closed	High	✓	✗	18+	For those sentenced in the Special Criminal Court; subversive crime	National	229	0	224	0
Arbour Hill Prison	Dublin 7	1848 (Original Facility) 1975 (Civilian Prison)	Closed	Medium	✓	✗	17+	Sexual offenders; long term sentences	National	137	0	134	0
Midlands Prison	Portlaoise, County Laois	2000	Closed	Medium	✓	✓	17+	None	Carlow, Kildare, Kilkenny, Laois, Offaly, Westmeath, Monaghan, Wexford, Wicklow	874	0	914	0
Loughan House	County Cavan	1973	Open	Low	✓	✗	18+	None	National	140	0	120	0
Shelton Abbey	Arklow, County Wicklow	1973	Open	Low	✓	✗	19+	None	National	115	0	98	0

One reason Ireland has a successful recidivism programme is the educational opportunities they provide while prisoners are serving a sentence. During a sentence, an inmate has access to a wide variety of classes, as well as personal tutoring services to help them succeed in their classes. These classes include home economics, art, pottery, photography, drama and music, crafts, technology, horticulture, and lastly science programs. There are also instructional technology courses available at certain facilities. If inmates do decide to attend classes, this allows them to be excused from some of the work duties that are required by the prison each day. All of this is provided through the Department of Justice and the Irish Vocational Education Committee. To decide what classes each inmate should enroll in, each inmate goes through an interviewing process. This helps the inmates because it gives them a personalized schedule that they would not be able to make on their own. Participating inmates are interviewed on a weekly basis to see if they are struggling in any classes. This allows the program to be more successful because if an inmate is having any trouble in their classes it is to be assessed right away so they can get the help they need to get back on track (Literacy Work in Prison).

=== Future ===
As of 2025, the Irish Prison Service was embarking on a large-scale prison reform plan. This is proposed to include the construction of several hundred new prison spaces by 2031. According to a statement by the Minister of Justice, Jim O'Callaghan, in November 2025, the prison service is planning on possibly constructing new prisons in Cork and Dublin. From 2026-2030, a €527 million capital investment is to be made out to the Irish Prison Service, with €495 million allocated for "capital works to build 1,595 prison spaces by 2031". These works are projected to include a new prison in Cork (or at an expansion of the existing Cork Prison), a new block at Wheatfield Prison, and extensions to Castlerea, Midlands, Mountjoy, Portlaoise, Limerick and the Dóchas Centre. In November 2025, the minister reportedly stated that a "master plan for the Thornton site will be developed in 2026".

== Minors ==
Formerly, children in Ireland (North and South) were detained in Industrial Schools or Reformatory Schools. Currently, within the Republic of Ireland, they are detained in institutions called Children Detention Schools. These detention schools are managed by the Irish Youth Justice Service. There are four facilities for the detention of "children", defined as boys under the age of 17 and girls under the age of 18:

- Finglas Child and Adolescent Centre Children Detention School
- Oberstown Children Detention Campus (separate boys' and girls' schools)

== Defunct prisons ==
- Spike Island
- Clonmel Borstal
- Geneva Barracks
- Kilmainham Gaol
- Newgate Prison, Dublin
- Richmond General Penitentiary
- Roscommon Jail (Now Stone Court Shopping Centre)
- Sligo Gaol
- The Black Dog, Dublin
- Cork City Gaol
- Cork County Gaol
- Wicklow Gaol

== Statutory basis of the penal system in Ireland ==
- Children Act (2001)
- Criminal Justice Act (1960)
- Criminal Justice Act (1997)
- Criminal Justice Act (2000)
- Criminal Law Act (1997)
- Detention of Offenders (Castlerea) Regulations (1998)
- Detention of Offenders (Loughan House) Regulations (1973)
- Detention of Offenders (Shanganagh Castle) Regulations (1970)
- Detention of Offenders (Shelton Abbey) Regulations (1976)
- Detention of Offenders (The Curragh) Regulations (1996)
- Detention of Offenders (Training Unit) Regulations (1975)
- ECHR Bill (2001)
- General Provisions Board (1928)
- Human Rights Commission Act (2000)
- Illegal Immigrants Trafficking Act (2000)
- Immigration Act (1999)
- Immigration Act (2003)
- Immigration Act (2004)
- Medical Practitioners Act (1927)
- Non-Fatal Offences Act (1997)
- Ombudsman Act (1980)
- Ombudsman for Children Act (2002)
- Organisation of Working Time Regulations (1998)
- Prison Act (1933)
- Prison Act (1956)
- Prison Act (1970)
- Prison (Disciplinary Code for Officers) Rules (1996)
- Prisoners Temporary Release Rules (1960)
- Prisons Visiting Commitiees Act (1925
- Prisons Visiting Committees Order (1925)
- Refugee Act (1996)
- Rules for the Government of Prisons (1947)
- Rules for the Government of Prisons (1955)
- Rules for the Government of Prisons (1976)
- Rules for the Government of Prisons (1983)
- Rules for the Government of Prisons (1987)
- Safety Health and Welfare at Work Act (1989)
- Social Welfare (Social Assistance Regulations) (1993)

== See also ==
- Northern Ireland Prison Service

== Bibliography ==
- O'Donnell, Ian (1 July 2004). "Imprisonment and Penal Policy in Ireland". The Howard Journal of Criminal Justice. 43 (3): 253–266. doi:10.1111/j.1468-2311.2004.00326.x.
