= Andy "The Bull" McSharry =

Irish sheep farmer from County Sligo

Andy McSharry
- Other name: "the Bull"
- Occupation: Farmer
- Known for: Campaigning against hill walkers

Andy "the Bull" McSharry is an Irish sheep farmer from County Sligo who came to national attention after a seventeen-year campaign during which he objected to casual walkers trespassing on his land, a dispute which inspired other farmers to object to similar treatment. The dispute began in 1992 and concluded in 2009.

McSharry lives on a 225-acre (0.91 km^{2}) farm in Gleniff, near Ben Bulben in North County Sligo. He is married and has family. He is known for wearing an Indiana Jones-type broad-brimmed hat and he refers to himself as "the Bull", a reference to the character in John B. Keane's play The Field. Fine Gael's spokesperson on Arts, Sports and Tourism Jimmy Deenihan once said of McSharry: "John B would have loved to have met you". The farmer has often been seen driving around on an all-terrain vehicle to ensure his land is not invaded.

The dispute began when McSharry's lands were included in a guidebook distributed to walkers despite him not having authorised this. The route through his lands was taken out of the book; however walkers still wandered onto his lands even when he posted "Keep Out" notices. The publicity raised by McSharry prompted other farmers to also defend their lands.

In 2003, he was convicted of issuing threats to hillwalkers the previous year and, upon refusal to pay a €300 fine, was sent to prison for two weeks in January the following year. He had even considered going on hunger strike, saying the publicity generated by the case was attracting even more curious people onto his lands and that half a dozen people had even trampled down part of his fence. During an interview on his sentencing he said: "There is no way farmers can give away land to strangers. We must get our share. There is no free inch or no free land in the country". Two hundred farmers, including president of the Irish Farmers' Association John Dillon, protested at his sentencing and gathered outside the gates of Loughan House open prison in County Cavan to welcome him as he was released from his confinement. In an interview with Farm Week on RTÉ Radio 1 after his release he said: "There is no way in hell I will let walkers through my land for nothing".

A report sent to Irish Minister for Community, Rural and Gaeltacht Affairs Éamon Ó Cuív later in January 2004 suggested the establishment of a national council to deal with land ownership and access rights. Speaking at the annual general meeting of the Irish Cattle and Sheepfarmers' Association in February 2004, McSharry compared the group Keep Ireland Open to the Mafia, saying: "These people want a slice of everyone's action for nothing". A "peace deal" was offered in October 2004 as a "goodwill gesture" where walkers could access lands for one day.

The dispute came to an end in September 2009 with Minister Ó Cuív visiting to publicly shake hands with McSharry and launch a new mountain walk at his home in Gleniff. No money exchanged hands.

McSharry's story was documented in the RTÉ television series Léargas.
