= Limerick Prison =

Prison in Limerick, Ireland

Limerick Prison in Limerick is an Irish penal institution.

It is a closed, medium security prison, and has an official capacity of 290 male beds and 20 female beds. The average daily number of male inmates in 2009 was 298 and of female inmates 22.

== History ==
Although built between 1815 and 1821 much of this facility has undergone extensive renovation of late. Many but not all of the old wings have been knocked down and replaced with new units provided with modern sanitation facilities. The original female section of the prison is generally not used except in cases of severe overcrowding, as a new modern female unit has been constructed.

In 2012, the Inspector of Prisons described parts of Limerick Prison as dirty, unhygienic, and severely overcrowded.

== See also ==
- Prisons in Ireland
