= Life imprisonment in Ireland =

Life imprisonment (Irish: príosúnacht bheatha) in Ireland may last for the natural life of the convict. While life imprisonment is the most severe penalty possible under Irish law, it is not necessarily "life imprisonment" in practice, as not all of the life sentence is generally served in prison custody. The granting of temporary or early release of life sentenced prisoners is a feature of the Irish prison system handled by the Minister for Justice, Home Affairs and Migration.

In deciding on the release from prison of a prisoner sentenced to life imprisonment, the minister will always consider the advice and recommendations of the Parole Board of Ireland: the Board, as of 2021, will normally review prisoners sentenced to life imprisonment after 12 years have been served (previously seven).

Unlike in other jurisdictions, sentencing judges cannot set minimum terms to be served, nor can they impose an indefinite sentence without the possibility parole.

Prisoners serving very long sentences, including life sentences, are normally reviewed on a number of occasions over a number of years before any substantial concessions are recommended by the Board. Parole applications are considered every two years

The average time spent in custody by those sentenced to life has risen significantly in recent years. From 1975 to 1984 the average time spent in custody by those sentenced to life was 7.5 years. This figure has continued to rise over the decades. In 2023, prisoners released on parole had served an average of 24 years in custody.

The final decision as to whether a life sentenced prisoner is released rests solely with the minister. Therefore, the length of time spent in custody by offenders serving life sentences can vary.

== Offences carrying a mandatory life sentence ==
Life imprisonment is the mandatory sentence in Ireland for murder or treason.

== Offences carrying a possible life sentence ==
Life imprisonment is a possible sentence for a number of offence in Ireland. However, as of 27 February 2025, only 12 of the 378 people imprisoned for life in Ireland were sentenced for an offence other than murder.

The below offences can carry a life sentence at the discresion of the courts.

- Homicide
  - Attempted murder
  - Conspiracy to murder
  - Manslaughter
- Terrorism
  - Terrorist offences
  - Hostage taking.
  - Terrorist bombing.
- Sexual Offences
  - Aggravated sexual asault.
  - Rape.
  - Defilement of child under 15 years of age.
- Offences against the person
  - Torture.
  - Human Trafficking.
  - Assault causing serious harm.
  - Non-fatal strangulation or non-fatal suffocation causing serious harm.
  - Assault causing serious harm aggravated by hatred.
  - Assault with a contaminated syringe or blood.
  - Intentionaly placing a contamininated syringe with intent to injure another.
  - False imprisonment
- Property offences
  - Arson
  - Criminal damage endangering life
  - Aggravated burglary
  - Robbery
- Drug offences
  - Possession of controlled drugs for unlawful sale or supply
  - Possession of controlled drugs with value exceeding €13,000
  - Importation of controlled drugs with value exceeding €13,000
- Weapons offences
  - Possession of firearms with intent to endanger life.
  - Use of a firearm to assist or aid escape.
  - Nuclear weapon offences.
  - Biological weapon offences.
  - Chemical weapon offences.
  - Causing an explosion endagering life or property.
- Aviation and Maritime offences
  - Unlawful seizure of aircraft.
  - Certain violent acts against ships and persons on board ships.
- Military law
  - The Defence Act, 1954 outlines numerous offences for members of the Defence Forces which can carry a life sentence upon court martial. Examples include, desertion, mutiny, and war crimes.
