= Irish Prison Service =

Government agency of the Republic of Ireland

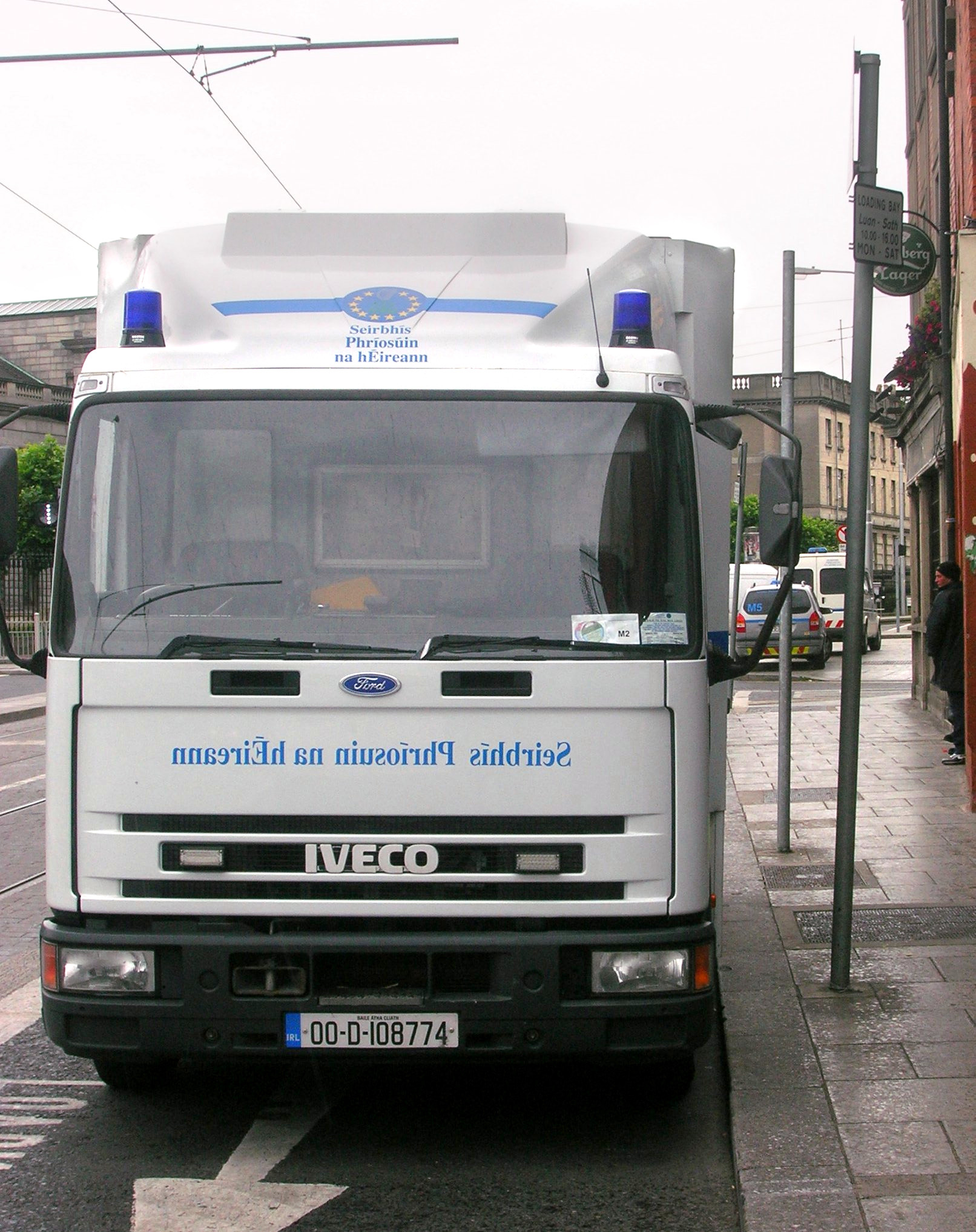
Irish Prison Service van parked near the Four Courts

The Irish Prison Service (IPS) (Seírbhis Phríosuin na hÉireann) manages the day-to-day operation of prisons in Ireland. Political responsibility for the Ireland's prisons rests with the Minister for Justice, Home Affairs and Migration.

== History ==
In 1928, the Minister for Justice of the Irish Free State, Kevin O'Higgins, dissolved by statutory instrument the General Prisons Board, which had been established in the pre-independence era to manage the Irish prison system. Thus, the responsibility for the management of the Irish prison system devolved to the minister and his department.

In 1999 the Minister for Justice, Equality and Law Reform, John O'Donoghue established the Irish Prison Service as an agency to administer Irish prisons. Also in 1999, the Minister created the Prisons Authority Interim Board, whose members were appointed by the Minister, as an advisory board to the Irish Prison Service. In 2002, the first Inspector of Prisons in the post-independence era, retired High Court Judge Dermot Kileen was also appointed by the Minister.

== Mission and services ==
According to the Irish Prison Service website, their official mission is "providing safe and secure custody, dignity of care and rehabilitation to prisoners for safer communities." In line with this goal, the service offers a number of services to prisoners. These include drug treatment services involve systematic detoxification and general psychological services to help with rehabilitation. Prisons within the system offers basic education classes, as well as specialized classes in literacy, creative arts, technology, life skills, and healthy living. Work and vocational training programs are also available to prisoners who want to learn them; examples are Braille, woodworking, metalworking, construction, and computers.

Governor Michael O'Mahoney was appointed governor for special needs on 1 March 2024.

== Budget and staff ==
As of 2018, the Irish Prison Service oversees 12 facilities with an official capacity of 4,269, and a total population of 3,992, including pretrial detainees. Among all prisoners, 4.6% are female, 16.7% are pretrial detainees, and 1.0% are under the age of 18.

In 2018, the Irish Prison Service had an annual budget of €327.37 million and it had a staff of 3,186 people.

== See also ==
- Prisons in Ireland
- Witness Security Programme
