= Vormsi =

Island in Estonia

Native name: Ormsö
- Location within Estonia Location within Europe

Geography
- Location: Baltic Sea
- Coordinates: 59°00′N 23°13′E
- Archipelago: West Estonian archipelago
- Area: 93 km^{2} (36 sq mi)

Administration
- Estonia
- County: Lääne County

Demographics
- Population: 415 (15 October 2011)
- Pop. density: 4.5/km^{2} (11.7/sq mi)

Vormsi (Estonian Swedish: Årmse, Swedish: Ormsö, German: Worms, lit. 'Worm's-Island') is the fourth-largest island of Estonia, measuring 92 square kilometres (36 square miles) and a registered population of around 400. It is located in the Baltic Sea, northwest of the mainland and east of Hiiumaa island, and is part of the West Estonian archipelago (Moonsund archipelago).

Administratively the island forms part of Vormsi Parish (rural municipality).

== History ==
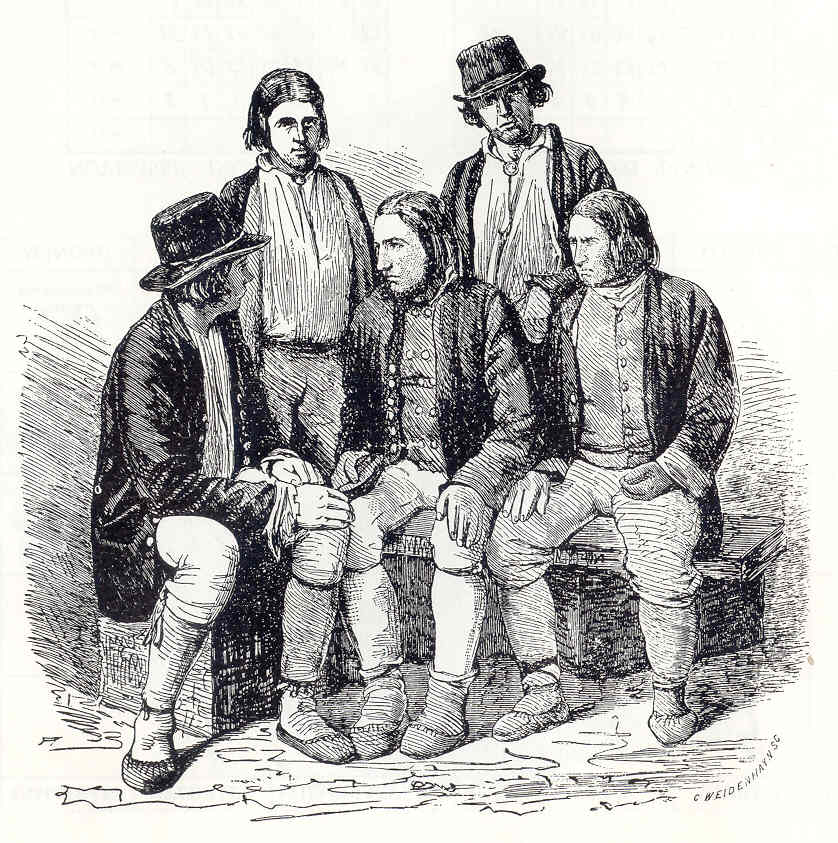
Estonian Swedes of Ormsö (1861)

The documented history of Vormsi dates back as far as the 13th century. During most of this time, the island was inhabited by Estonian Swedes ("rannarootslased" in Estonian or "coastal Swedes" in English). Ormsö in Swedish means "Orm's island", and can be translated also as "Snake island". The Estonian name Vormsi and German Worms have both been derived from Ormsö.

The island's population reached 3,000 before World War II. During the war, nearly all of Vormsi's population, along with other Swedes living in Estonia, forming the larger region of Aiboland, were evacuated, or fled, to Sweden.

== Villages ==
The villages on the island include: Hullo (the administrative centre), Sviby (the main port), Söderby, Norrby, Diby, Rälby, Förby, Borrby, Kärrslätt, Saxby, Suuremõisa (Magnushof, formerly Busby), Rumpo (the main beach area) and Hosby.

The island of Vormsi has homeowners from several countries and regions in Estonia, Sweden, Finland, Switzerland and elsewhere.

== Economy ==
Vormsi is the per capita wealthiest island and region in Estonia outside of the Tallinn metro area, with incomes on the same level as inner Tallinn. This is attributed to the fact that many comparatively wealthy people own summer homes on the island and are registered as residents, so their yearly income tax is forwarded to the island's budget.

Vormsi has only small businesses with no significant industrial activity. The island earns the majority of its revenues from the taxation on the salaries earned by its residents on the Estonian mainland.

== Literature ==
- Kanarbik, Madis, Ormsö. De estlandssvenska böndernas kamp mot godsägarna under 1700- och 1800-talet [Nordistica Tartuensia; 9] (Tartu, 2003)
- Beyer, Jürgen, 'Whom should one thank for a narrow escape? Lessons drawn from a perilous journey from Vormsi and Noarootsi to Finland in 1796', Pro Ethnologia 17 (2004), 175-95

== Gallery ==
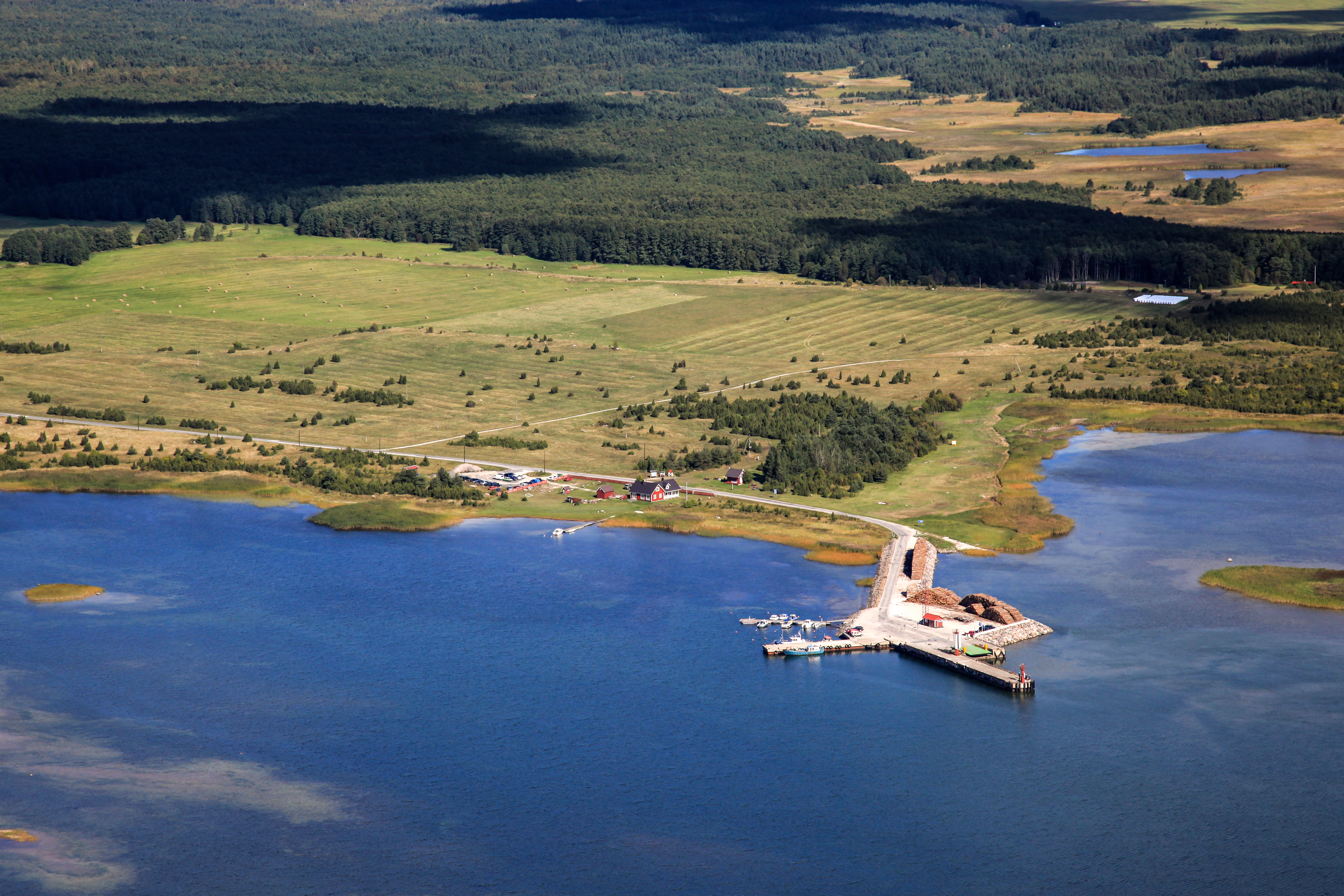
Vormsi harbour (2015)

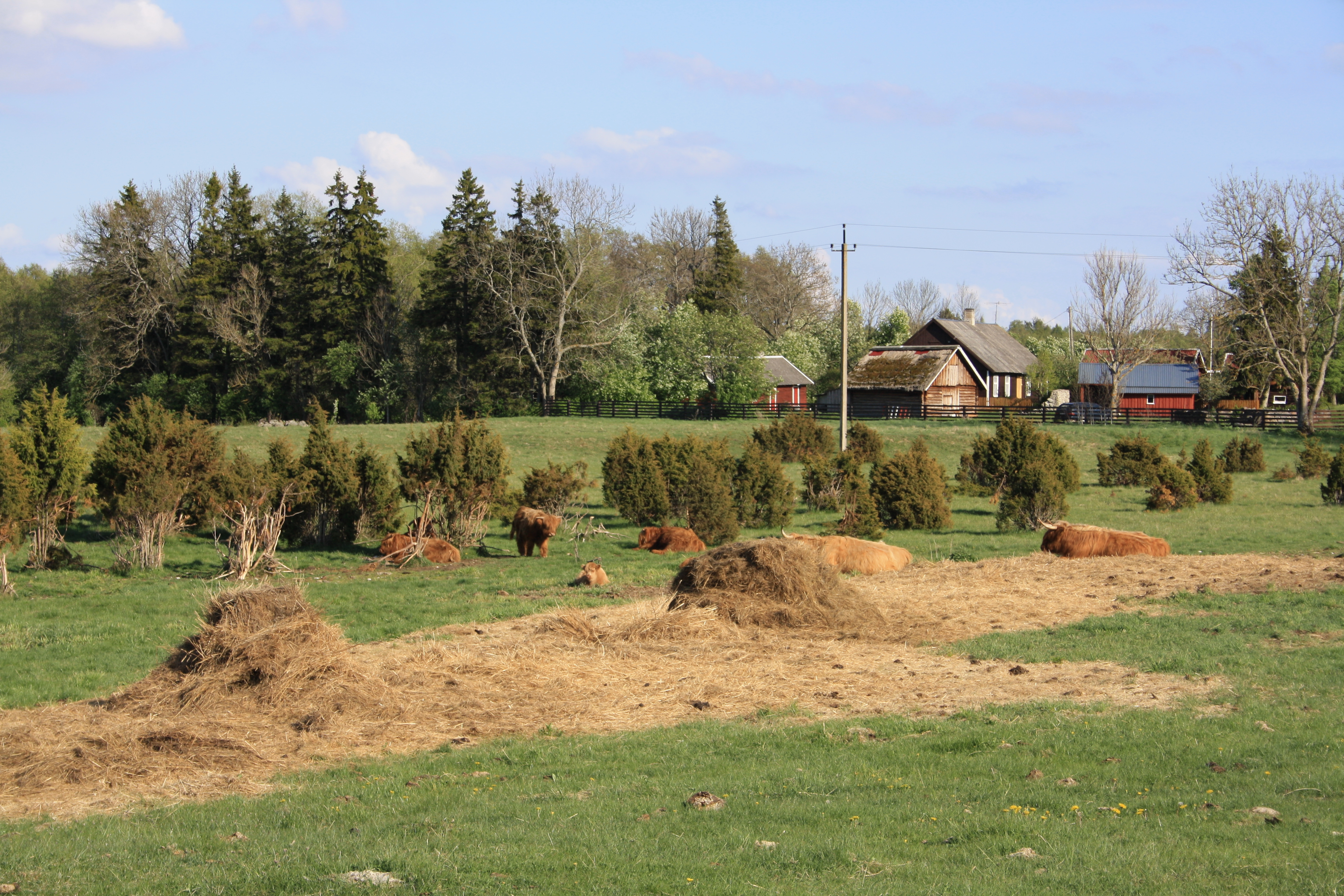
Paddock, Rälby

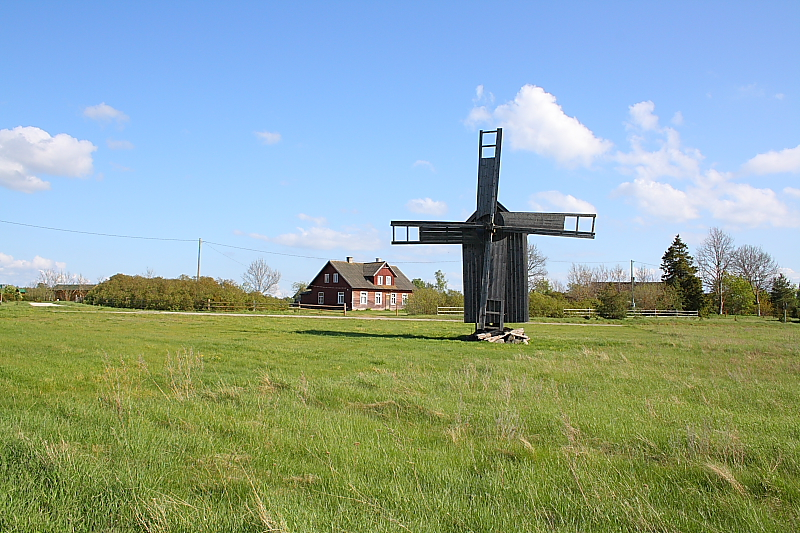
Old windmill, Rälby

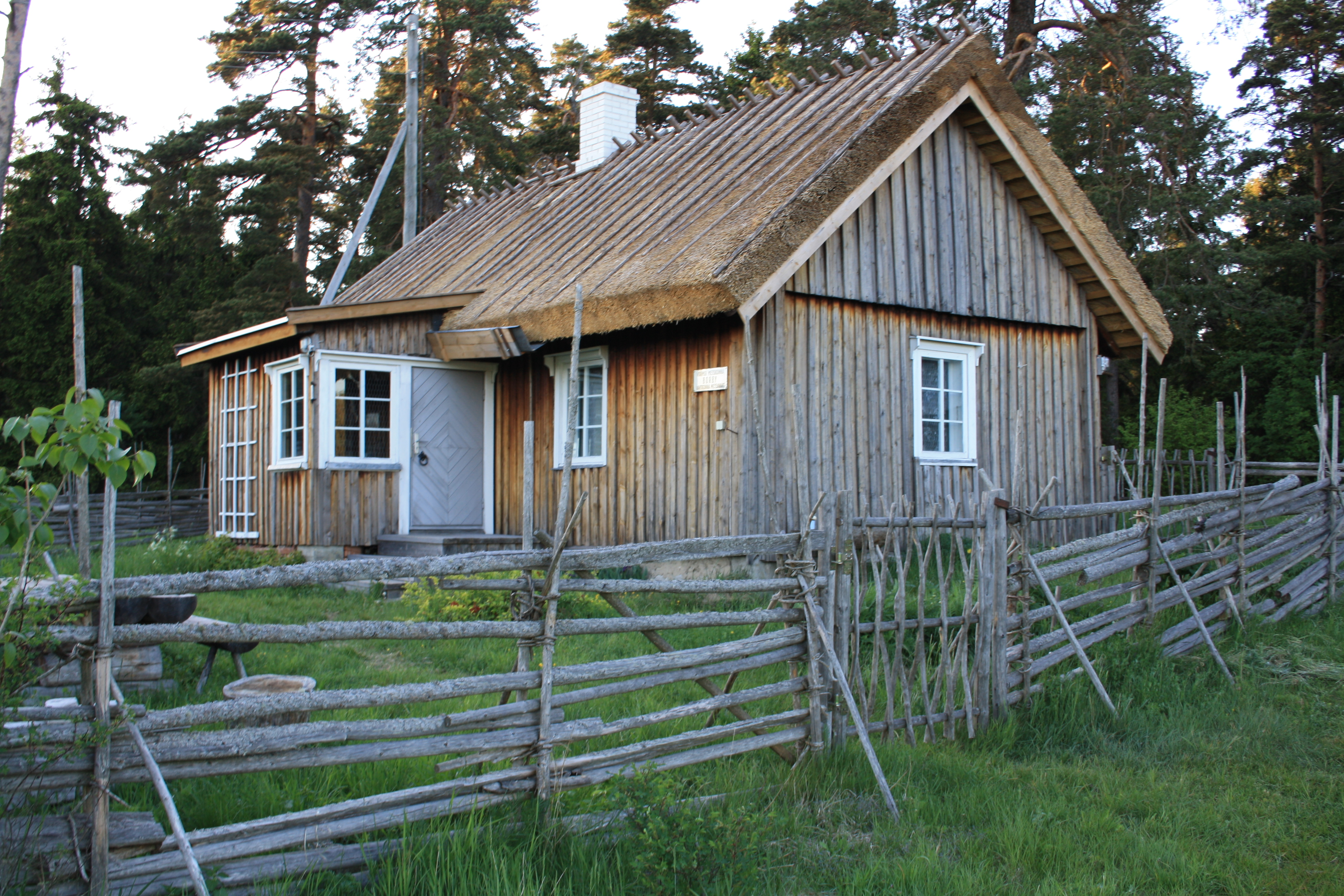
Woodsman's cottage, Hullo

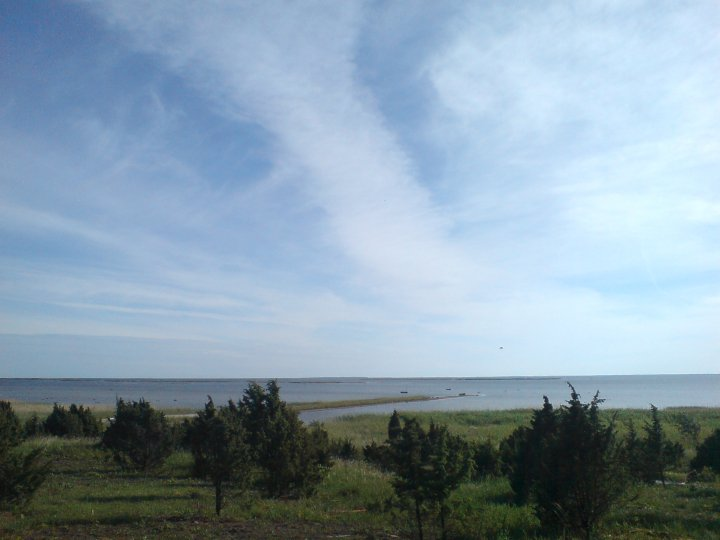
Beach area in Rumpo

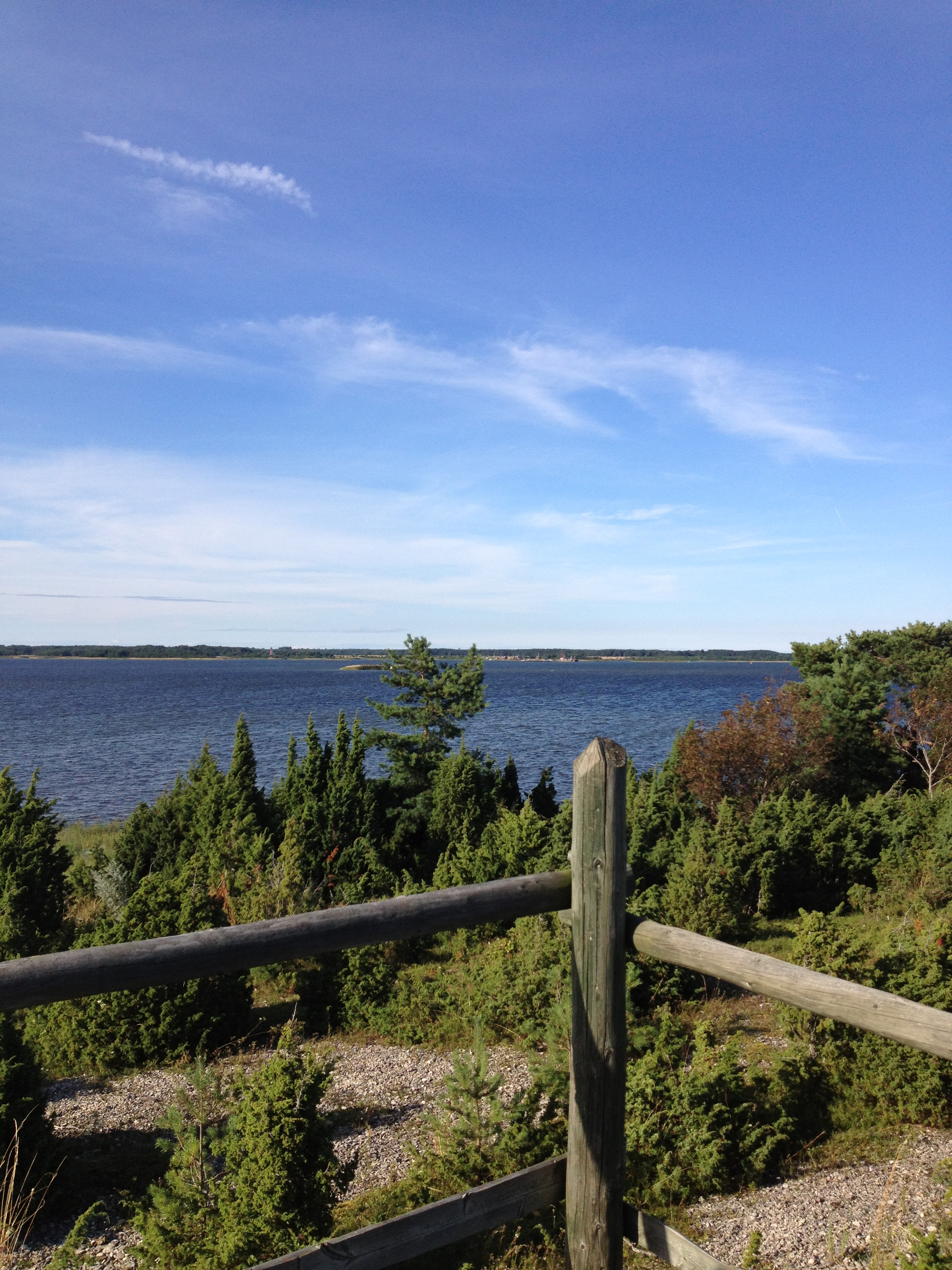
Viewing platform in Rumpo peninsula, looking towards Sviby harbor

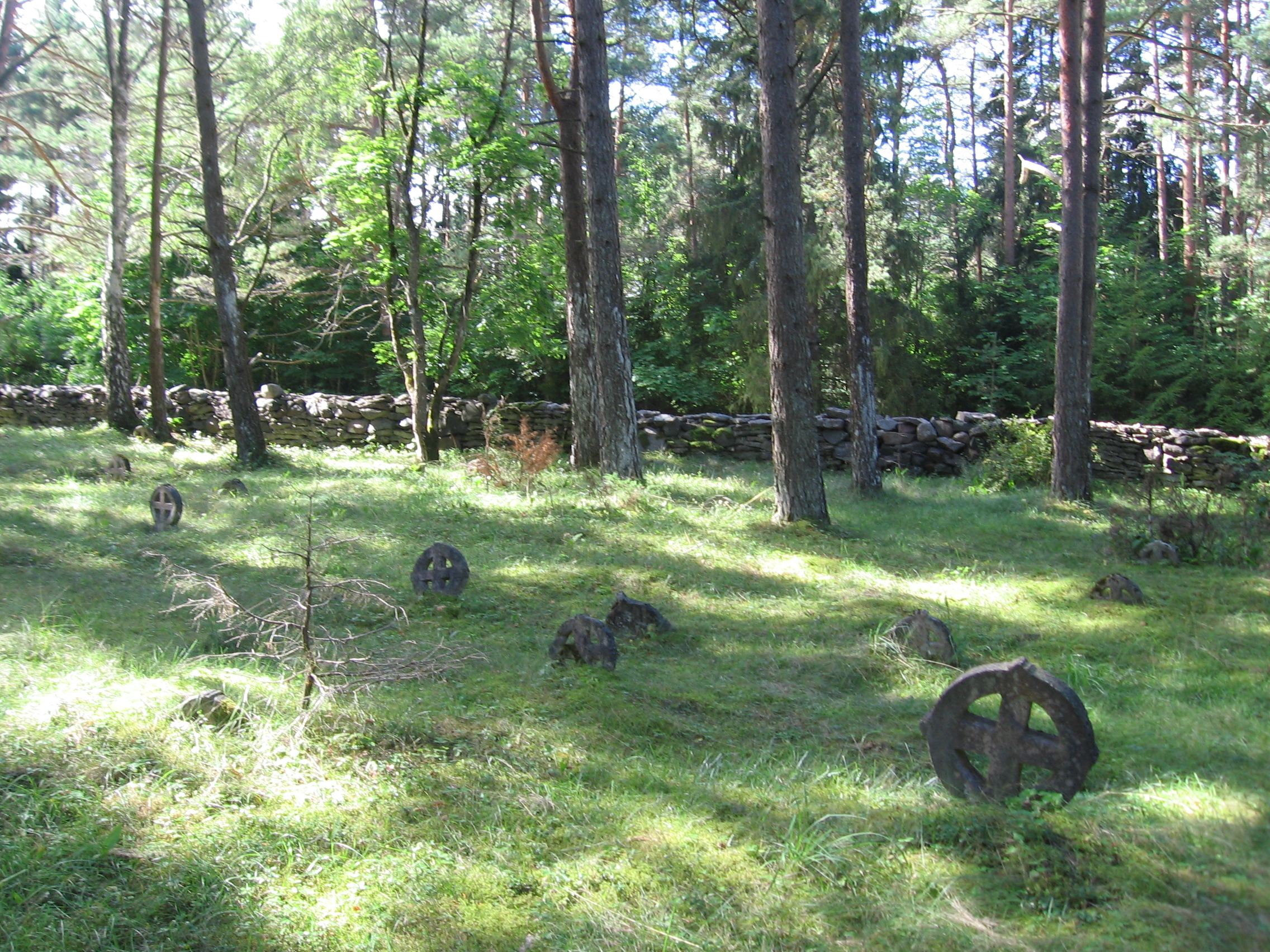
Vormsi cemetery

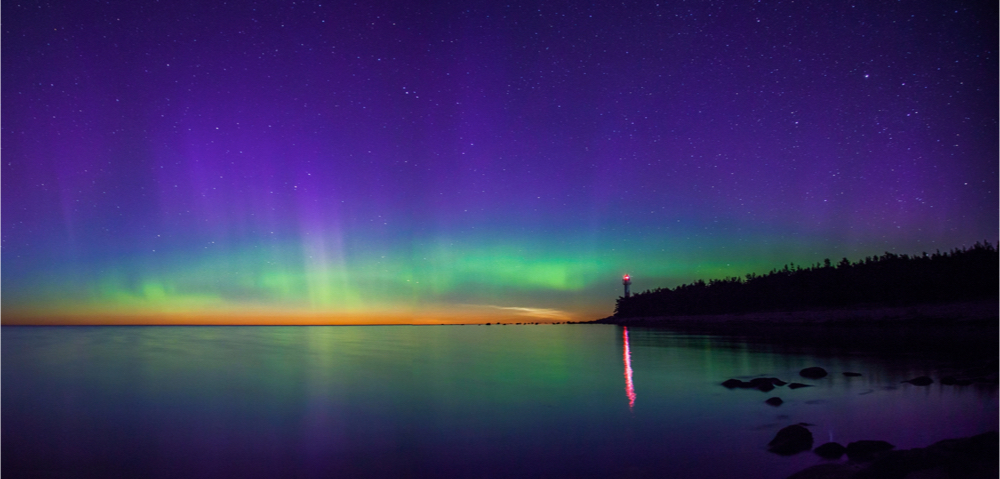
Aurora borealis in Saxby

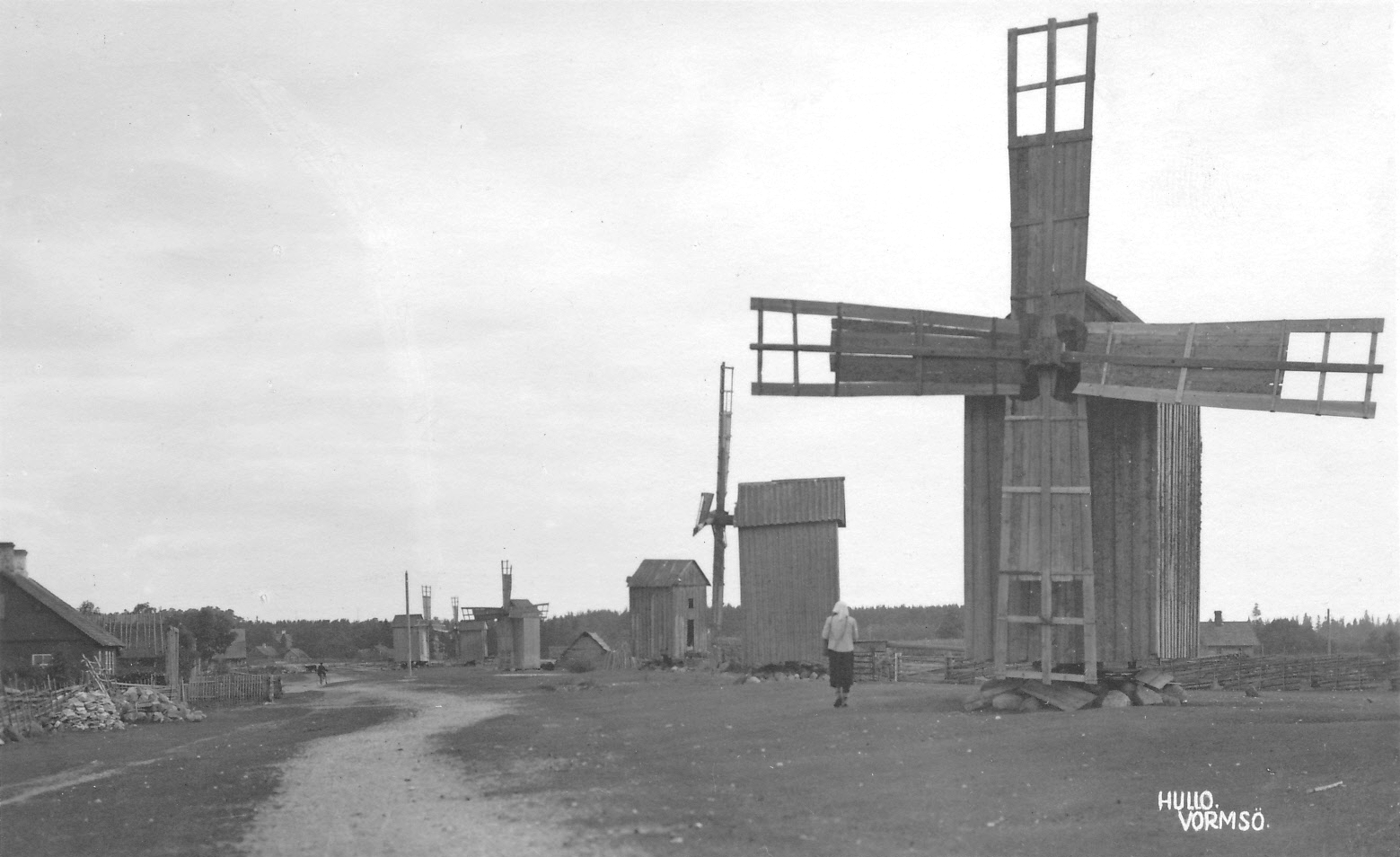
Windmills in Hullo, 1930s

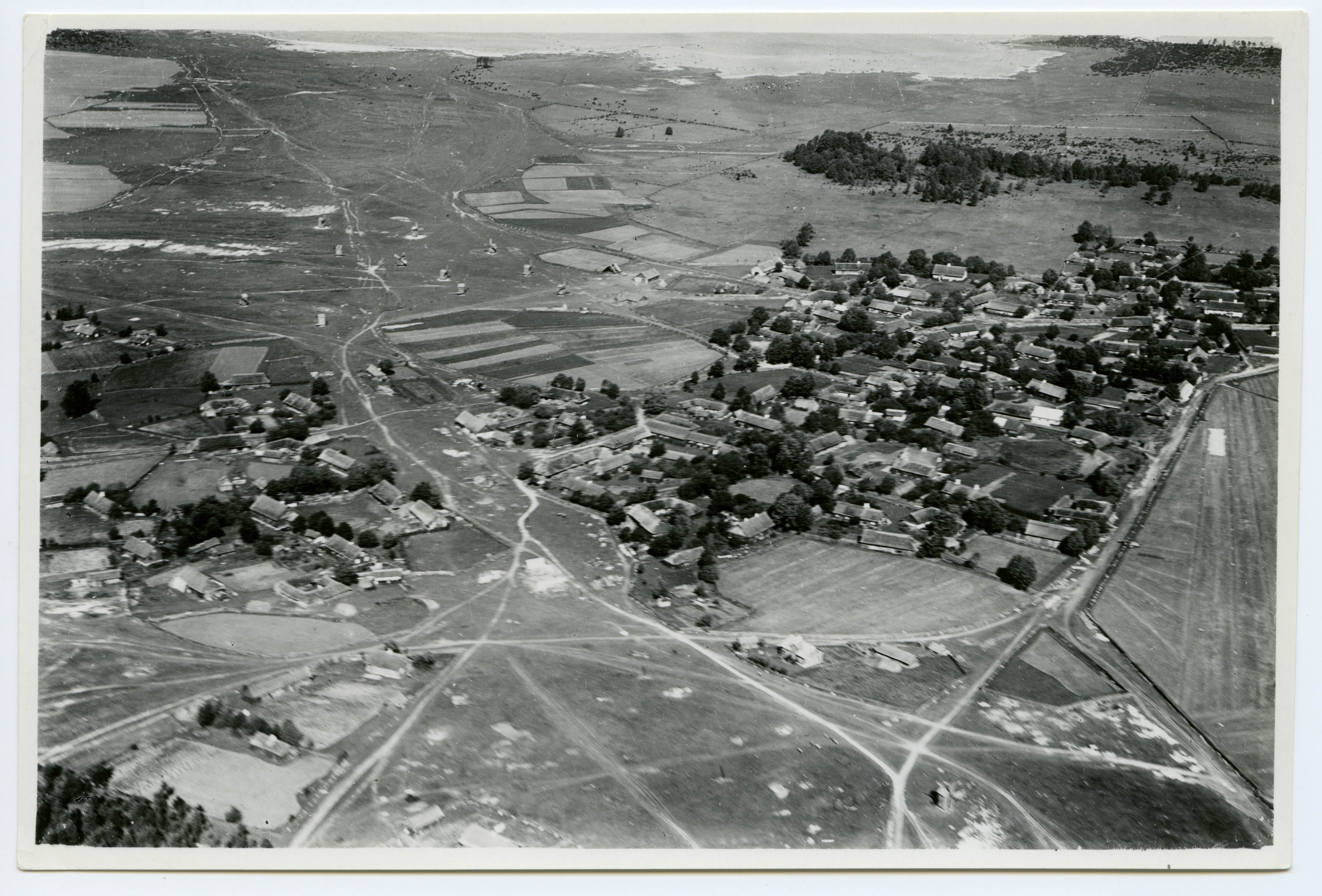
Aerial photo of the Borrby village, 1934

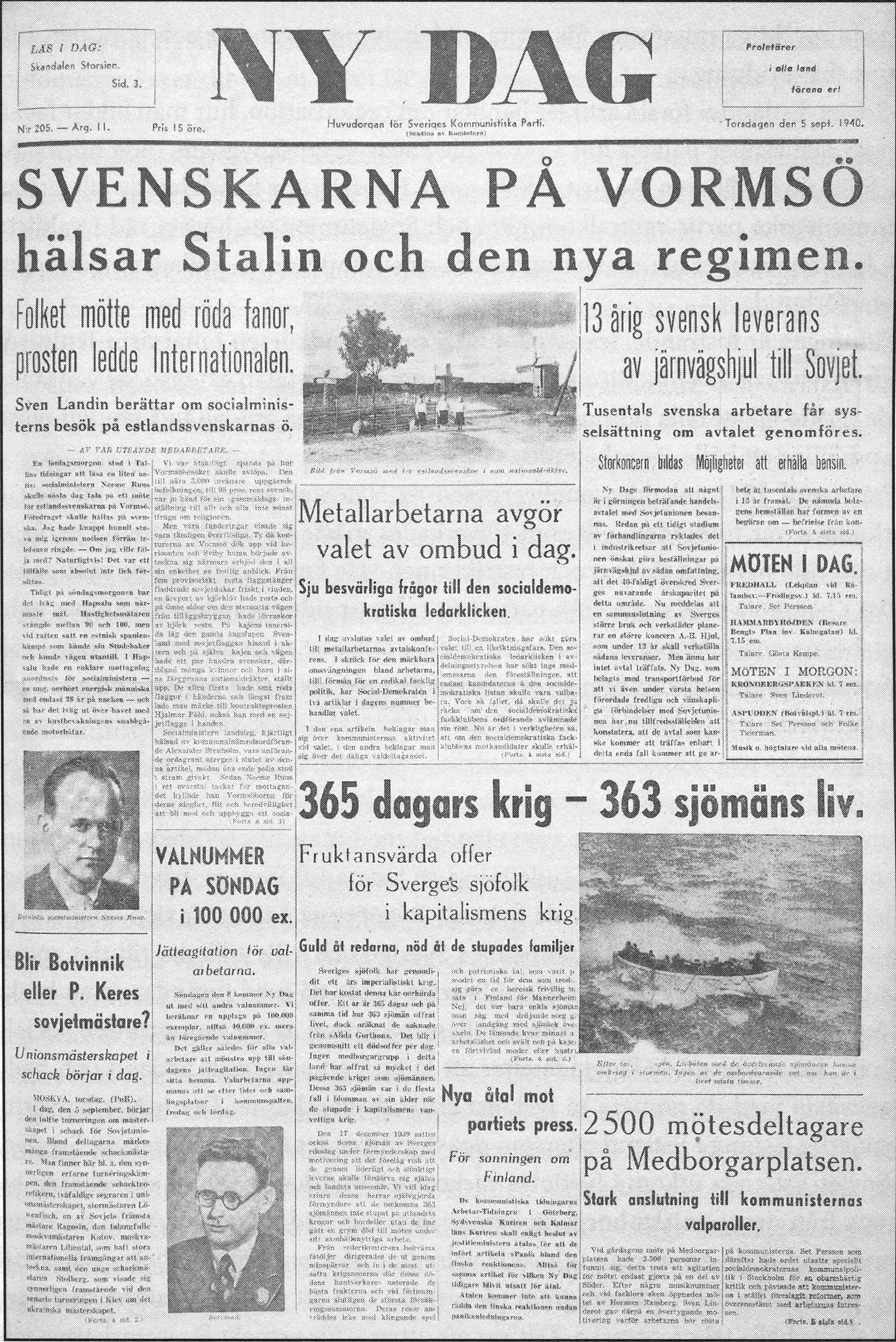
Swedish communist daily Ny Dag headline on 5 September 1940: "The Swedes on Vormsi greet Stalin and the new regime"

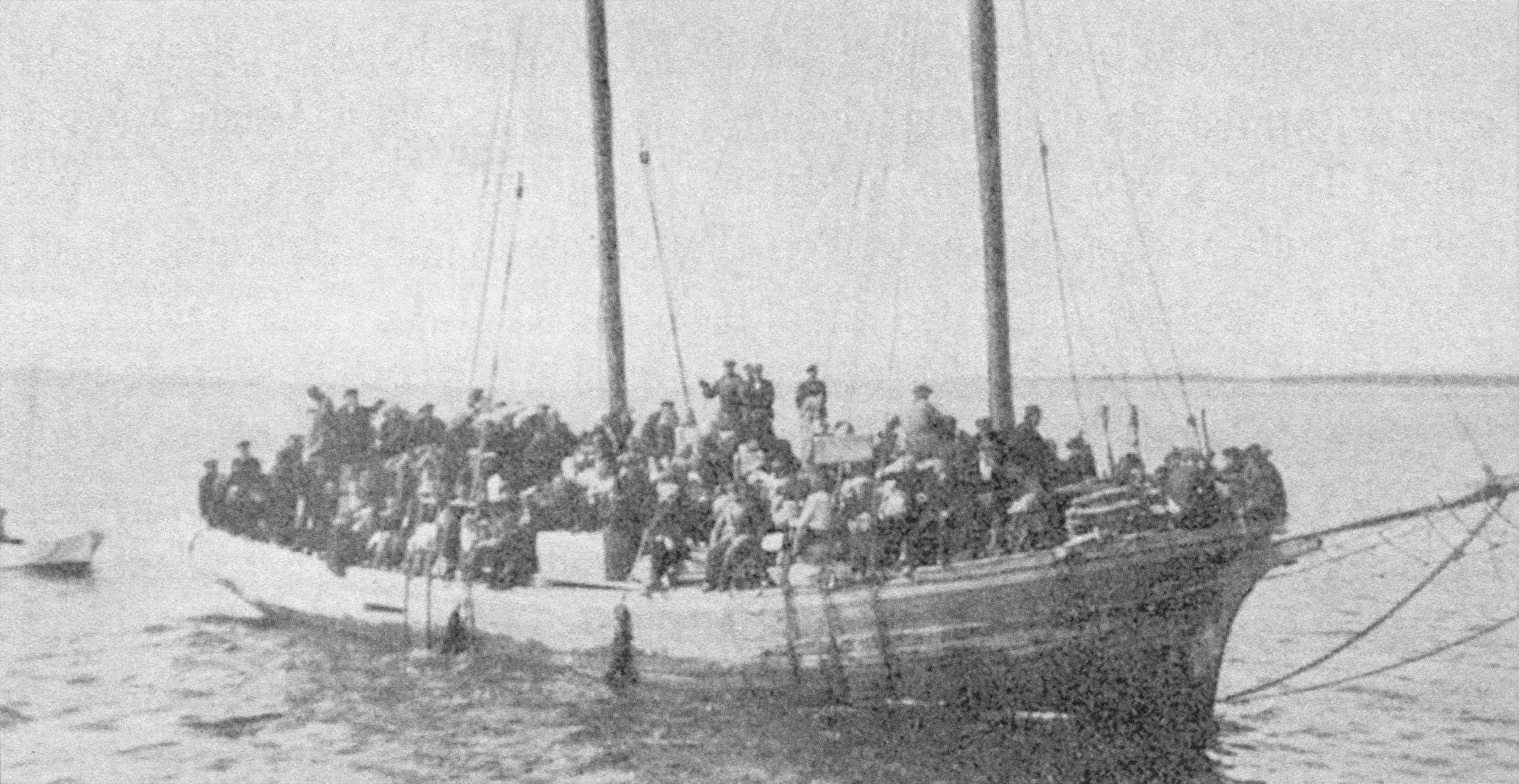
Fleeing the Soviet occupation to Sweden, 1944

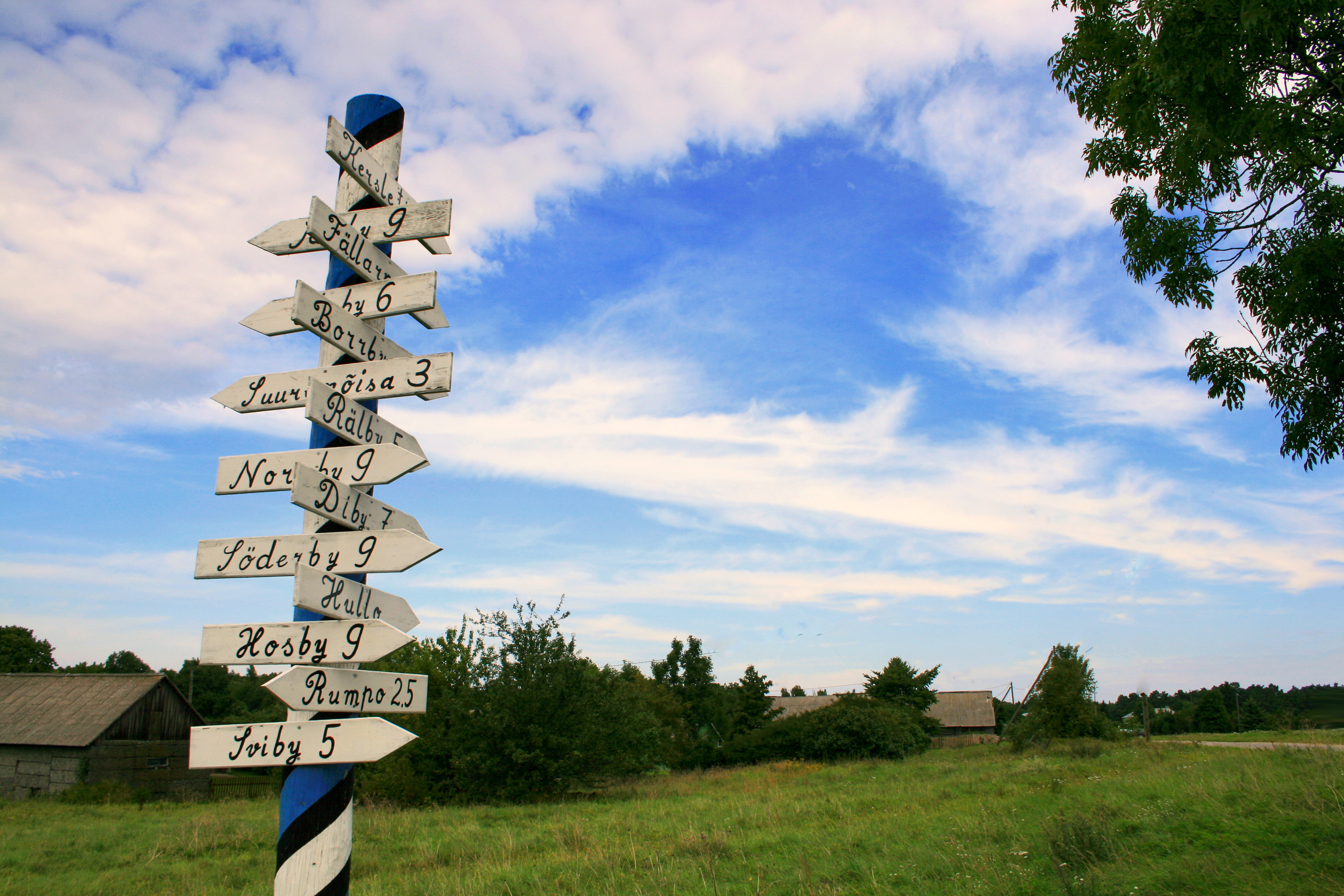
Road signs in Hullo

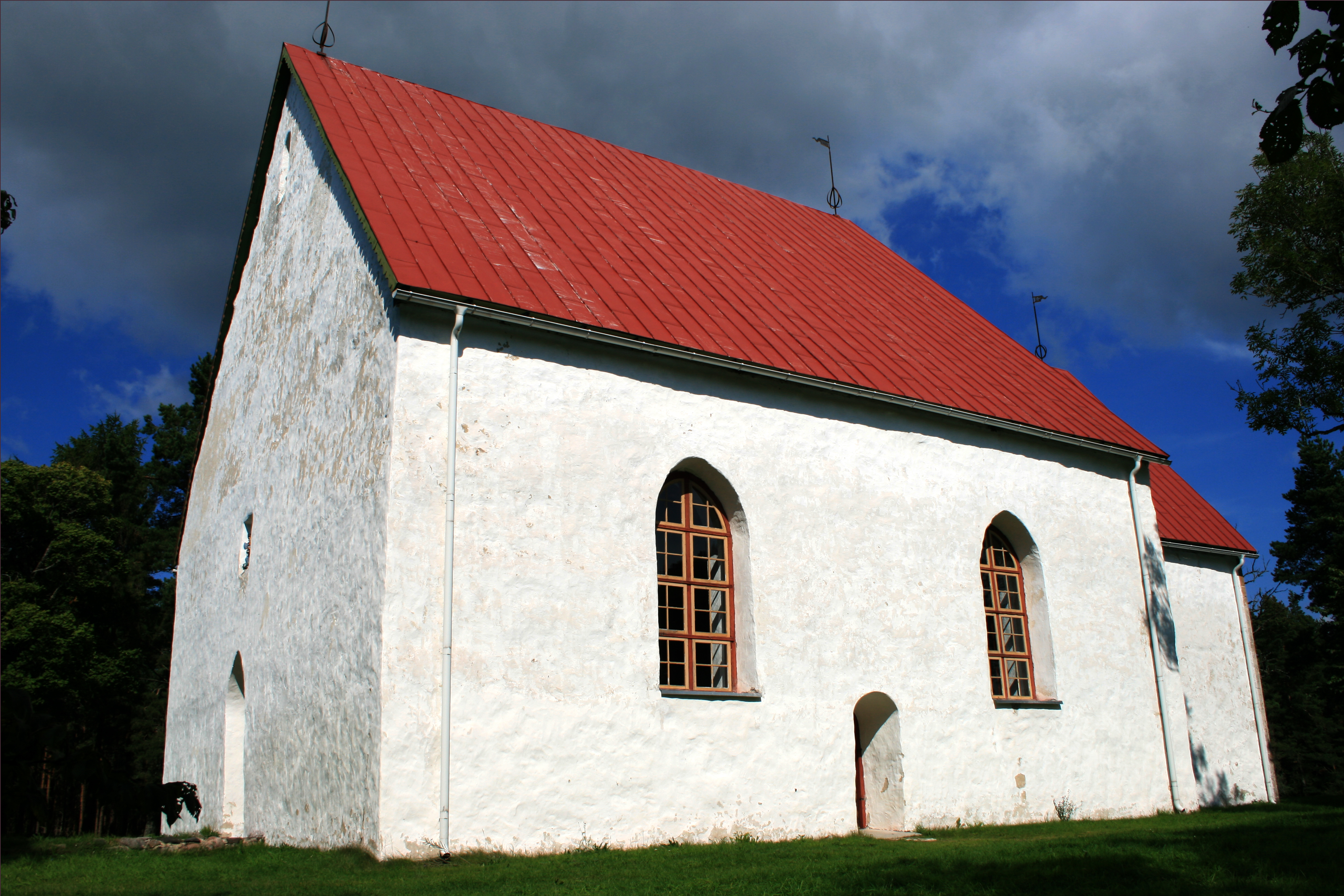
The 15th century Swedish (now Lutheran) church in Hullo (2011)

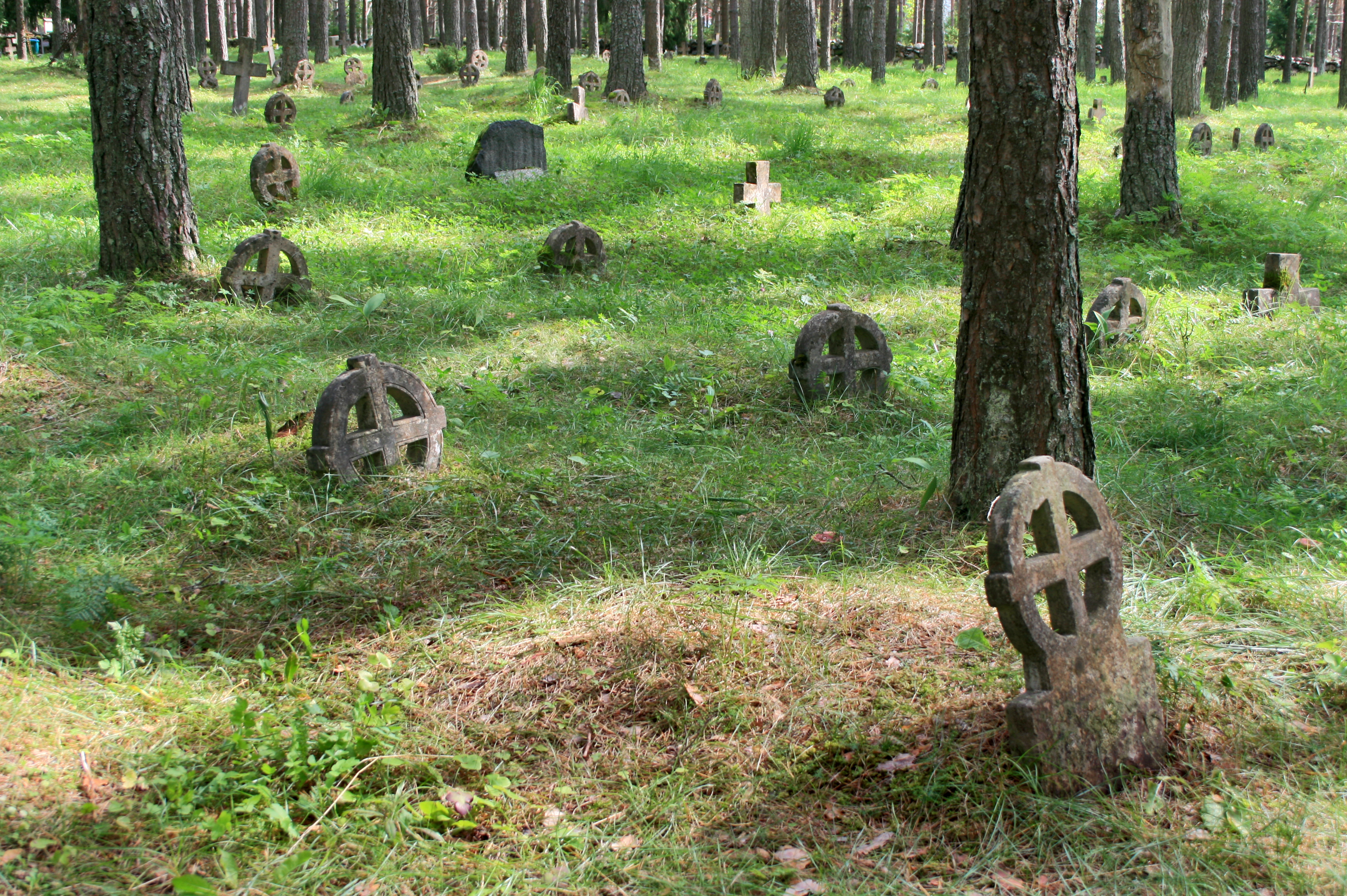
Round crosses in the Vormsi cemetery

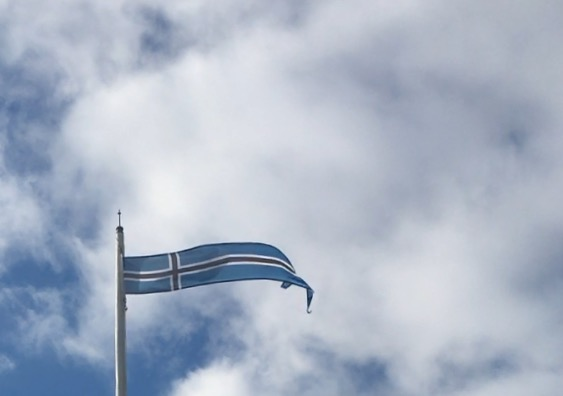
A Nordic cross flag used in Vormsi

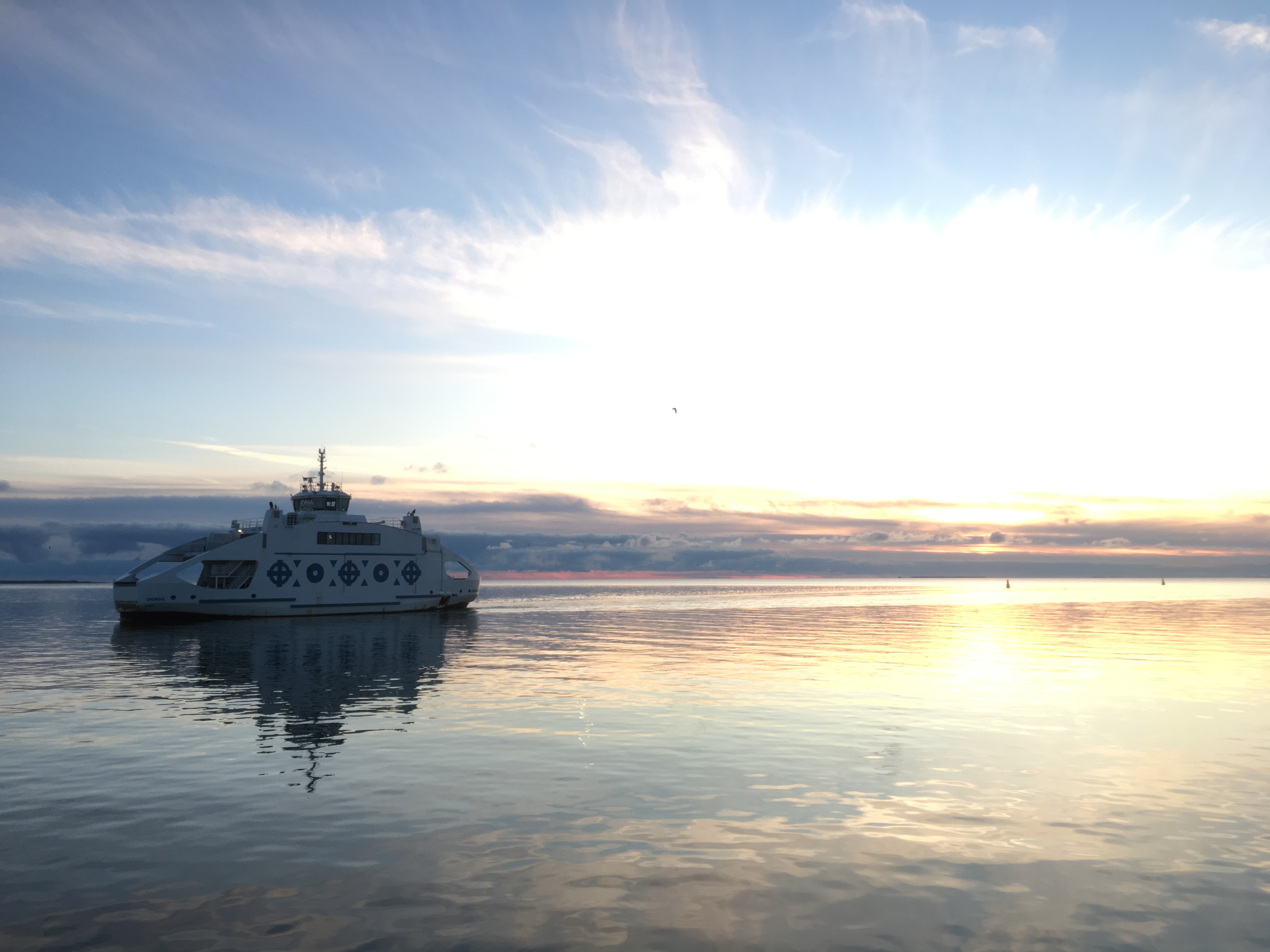
Vormsi is connected with the mainland by MS Ormsö (:et)
