= Norby (disambiguation) =

Norby is a fictional robot created by Janet and Isaac Asimov. Norby may also refer to

- Norby, the Mixed-Up Robot (1983), the first book in the Norby series by Janet and Isaac Asimov
- Norby (TV series), American sitcom television series
- Norby, a part of Thirsk, North Yorkshire
- Norby (name)

== See also ==
- Norrby (disambiguation)
