= Norrby =

Norrby may refer to

- Norrby, Estonia, a village in western Estonia
- Norrby Church in Sweden
- Norrby IF, a Swedish football club from Borås
- Samuel Norrby (1906–1955), Swedish shot putter
- Norrbys, Gotland, a cultural reserve in Sweden

== See also ==
- Norby (disambiguation)
