= Vormsi Landscape Conservation Area =

Protected area in Estonia

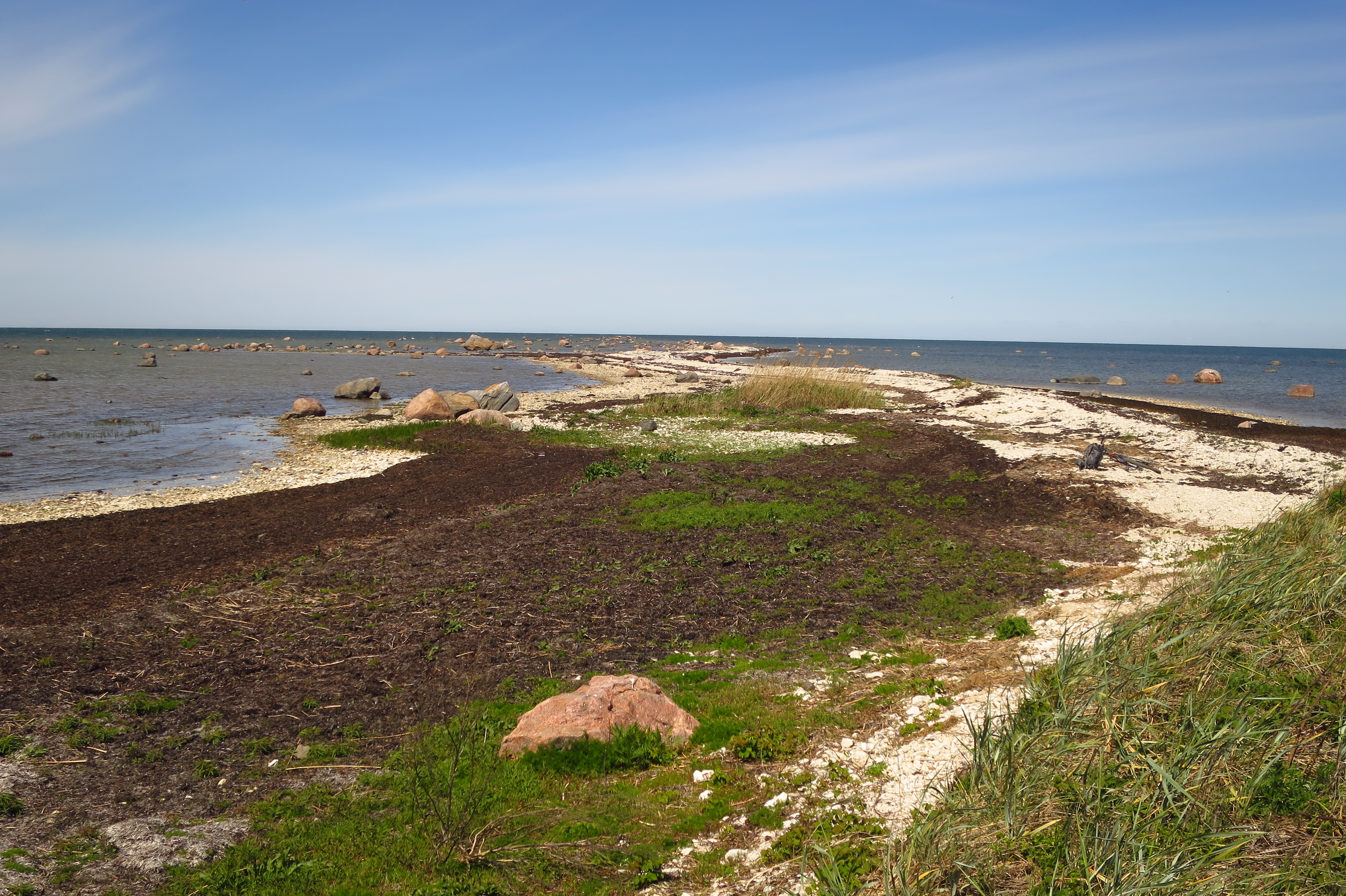

- Location within Estonia
- Location: Estonia
- Coordinates: 58°57′30″N 23°16′30″E
- Area: 2,423 ha (5,990 acres)
- Established: 2007

Vormsi Landscape Conservation Area is a nature reserve situated on Vormsi Island, Lääne County, Estonia.

Its area is 2423 ha.

The protected area was designated in 2007 to protect the nature of Vormsi Island.
