= Mind transfer (disambiguation) =

Mind transfer is a transfer of a biological mind to a computer.

Mind transfer may also refer to:

- Body swap, two people (or beings) exchange minds and end up in each other's bodies
- Mind transfer (biological), transfer of a biological mind to a biological body
- Mind Transfer (novel), a 1988 science fiction story by Janet Asimov

== See also ==
- Reincarnation, a transfer of a soul to another body after death
