= Forby =

Forby is a surname. Notable people with this surname include:

- Elizabeth Johnson Forby (1846?–1905), formerly enslaved American woman
- Gary Forby (born 1945), American state legislator
- Robert Forby (1759–1825), English philologist

== See also ==
- Förby, village in Estonia
