= Fällarna =

Village in Estonia

- Village
- Location within Estonia
- Coordinates: 59°00′37″N 23°11′36″E
- Country: Estonia
- County: Lääne County
- Parish: Vormsi Parish
- Time zone: UTC+2 (EET)
  - Summer (DST): UTC+3 (EEST)

Fällarna is a village in Vormsi Parish, Lääne County, in western Estonia.
