= Vormsi Parish =

Municipality of Estonia

Coordinates: 59°00′N 23°13′E

Vormsi Parish Vormsi vald (in Estonian) Ormsö kommun (in Swedish)
- Municipality of Estonia
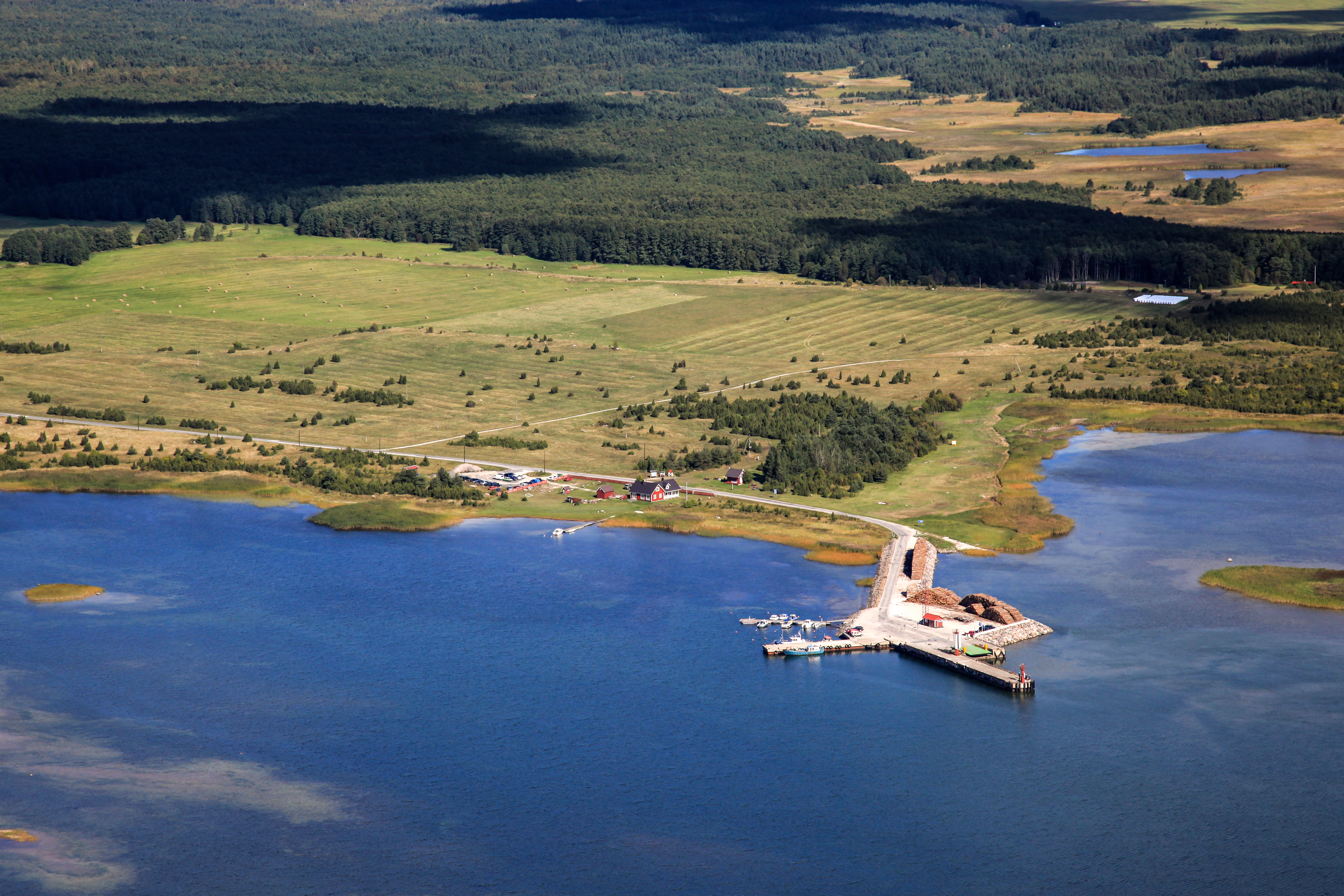
- Vormsi harbour

- Flag Coat of arms

- Vormsi Parish within Lääne County.
- Country: Estonia
- County: Lääne County
- Administrative centre: Hullo

Area
  - Total: 95.06 km^{2} (36.70 sq mi)

Population (1 January 2025)
  - Total: 268
  - Density: 2.82/km^{2} (7.30/sq mi)

Ethnicity
  - Estonians: 95%
  - other: 5%
- ISO 3166 code: EE-907
- Website: www.vormsi.ee

Vormsi Parish (Estonian: Vormsi vald; Swedish: Ormsö kommun) is a rural municipality of Estonia, in Lääne County. It covers the area of Vormsi island. The population of Vormsi is 231 (as of 1 January 2013) and has an area of 92.93 km^{2}.

== Settlements ==
There are 14 villages (küla) in Vormsi Parish: Borrby, Diby, Fällarna, Förby, Hosby, Hullo, Kersleti, Norrby, Rumpo, Rälby, Saxby, Sviby, Suuremõisa and Söderby.

== Religion ==
Religion in Vormsi Parish (2021)
1. Unaffiliated (70.3%)
2. Lutheran (14.8%)
3. Others Christians (11.1%)
4. Unknown (3.80%)
5. 0.00%
6. 0.00%

== History ==
The island of Vormsi rose from the sea at around 1000 B.C. Before World War II, Vormsi (Ormsö in Swedish) was mainly inhabited by Coastal Swedes, who formed the majority of the island's population of ~3000 people. Most of the Swedes moved to Sweden before the Soviet occupation of Estonia. After the restoration of independence of Estonia in 1991, Swedish families have started to return to the island and rebuild their former estates. Most of the Swedes visit the island during the summer season.

== Economy ==
Per capita income of Vormsi Parish is the third biggest in Estonia.
