= Janet Asimov =

American author, psychiatrist, psychoanalyst (1926–2019)

- Janet Asimov with her husband, Isaac
- Born: Janet Opal Jeppson; August 6, 1926; Ashland, Pennsylvania, U.S.
- Died: February 25, 2019 (aged 92); New York City, U.S.
- Education: Stanford University (BA); New York University Medical School (MD); William Alanson White Institute of Psychoanalysis
- Occupations: Writer; psychiatrist; psychoanalyst
- Spouse: Isaac Asimov (m. 1973; died 1992)
- Writing career
- Pen name: J. O. Jeppson
- Genre: Science fiction

Janet Opal Asimov (née Jeppson; August 6, 1926 – February 25, 2019), usually writing as J. O. Jeppson, was an American science fiction writer, psychiatrist, and psychoanalyst.

She started writing children's science fiction in the 1970s. She was married to Isaac Asimov from 1973 until his death in 1992, and they collaborated on a number of science fiction books aimed at young readers, including the Norby series. Jeppson authored the stories while Isaac helped edit and corrected any scientific errors. She died in February 2019 at the age of 92.

== Education and career ==
Jeppson earned a bachelor's degree from Stanford University (first attending Wellesley College), her M.D. from New York University Medical School, and completed her residency in psychiatry at Bellevue Hospital. In 1960, she graduated from the William Alanson White Institute of Psychoanalysis, where she continued to work until 1986. After her marriage to Isaac Asimov, she continued to practice psychiatry and psychoanalysis under the name Janet O. Jeppson, and she published medical papers under that name.

== Writing ==
Janet Asimov's first published writing was a "mystery short" sold to Hans Stefan Santesson for The Saint Mystery Magazine, which appeared in the May 1966 issue. Her first novel was The Second Experiment in 1974. Asimov wrote mostly science fiction novels for children throughout her career. As a psychiatrist she incorporated aspects of psychoanalysis, human identity, and other psychiatry-related ideas in her writing. According to Isaac Asimov, the books that Janet Asimov wrote in association with him were 90 percent Janet's, and his name was wanted on the books by the publisher "for the betterment of sales". After Isaac's death, she took on the writing of his syndicated popular-science column in the Los Angeles Times.

== Husband ==
Janet Jeppson began dating Isaac Asimov in 1970 immediately following his separation from Gertrude Blugerman. They were married on November 30, 1973, two weeks after Asimov's divorce from Gertrude. Despite Jeppson's upbringing in the Church of Jesus Christ of Latter-day Saints, their marriage was officiated by a leader of Ethical Culture, a humanist religious group that Janet later joined. On the same day, she learned that her first novel, The Second Experiment, would be published (under her maiden name).

Their marriage lasted until Isaac's death in 1992 from complications relating to HIV, contracted from a 1983 blood transfusion during bypass surgery. Janet reportedly consulted medical texts after Isaac began exhibiting symptoms, and she requested an HIV test be performed. His doctors insisted she was wrong and only tested Isaac for the infection after he became seriously ill. She wanted the information made public, but doctors insisted upon not disclosing it, even after Isaac died. After the doctors advising silence had all died, Janet Asimov went public with the knowledge.

== Bibliography ==
=== Novels ===
- The Second Experiment (1974) (as J. O. Jeppson)
- The Last Immortal (1980) (a sequel to The Second Experiment) (as J. O. Jeppson)
- Mind Transfer (1988)
- The Package in Hyperspace (1988)
- Murder at the Galactic Writers' Society (1994)
- The House Where Isadora Danced (2009) (as J. O. Jeppson)

=== Norby Chronicles (with Isaac Asimov) ===
- Norby, the Mixed-Up Robot (1983)
- Norby's Other Secret (1984)
- Norby and the Lost Princess (1985)
- Norby and the Invaders (1985)
- Norby and the Queen's Necklace (1986)
- Norby Finds a Villain (1987)
- Norby Down to Earth (1988)
- Norby and Yobo's Great Adventure (1989)
- Norby and the Oldest Dragon (1990)
- Norby and the Court Jester (1991)
- Norby and the Terrified Taxi (1997) Written alone, after her husband's death.

=== Collections ===
- The Mysterious Cure, and Other Stories of Pshrinks Anonymous (1985) (as J. O. Jeppson hardcover, as Janet Asimov paperback)
- The Touch: Epidemic of the Millennium. Edited by Patrick Merla. ISBN 0-7434-0715-6. (Janet Asimov contributor)

=== Anthologies ===
- Laughing Space: Funny Science Fiction Chuckled Over (1982) with Isaac Asimov

=== Nonfiction ===
- How to Enjoy Writing: A Book of Aid and Comfort (1987) with Isaac Asimov
- Frontiers II (1993) with Isaac Asimov
- It's Been a Good Life (2002) edited, with Isaac Asimov
- Notes for a Memoir: On Isaac Asimov, Life, and Writing (as Janet Jeppson Asimov) (New York: Prometheus Books, 2006); ISBN 1-59102-405-6
