= Norby (name) =

Norby or Nørby is a given name and a surname. Notable people and characters with these names include:

== Given name ==
- Norby Chabert (born 1975), American political consultant
- Norby Williamson, American business executive

== Surname ==
- Cæcilie Norby (born 1964), Danish jazz and rock singer
- Chris Norby (born 1949), American politician
- Connor Norby (born 2000), American baseball player
- Ellen Trane Nørby (born 1980), Danish politician
- Erik Norby (1936–2007), Danish composer
- Ghita Nørby (born 1935), Danish actress
- Henrik Norby (1889–1964), Norwegian Olympic modern pentathlete
- John Norby (1910–1998), American football running back
- Kate Norby (born 1976), American actress
- Paul R. Norby (1913–2015), rear admiral in the United States Naval Reserve
- Peter Nørby (born 1940), Danish chess player
- Reginald Norby (1934–2012), Norwegian diplomat
- Søren Norby (died 1530), Danish naval officer

== Fictional characters ==
- Norby, a robot created by Janet and Isaac Asimov
- Pearson Norby, lead character in the 1955 American TV sitcom Norby
