= Hullo =

Village in Estonia

- Village
- Location within Estonia
- Coordinates: 58°59′35″N 23°14′30″E
- Country: Estonia
- County: Lääne County
- Parish: Vormsi Parish
- Time zone: UTC+2 (EET)
  - Summer (DST): UTC+3 (EEST)

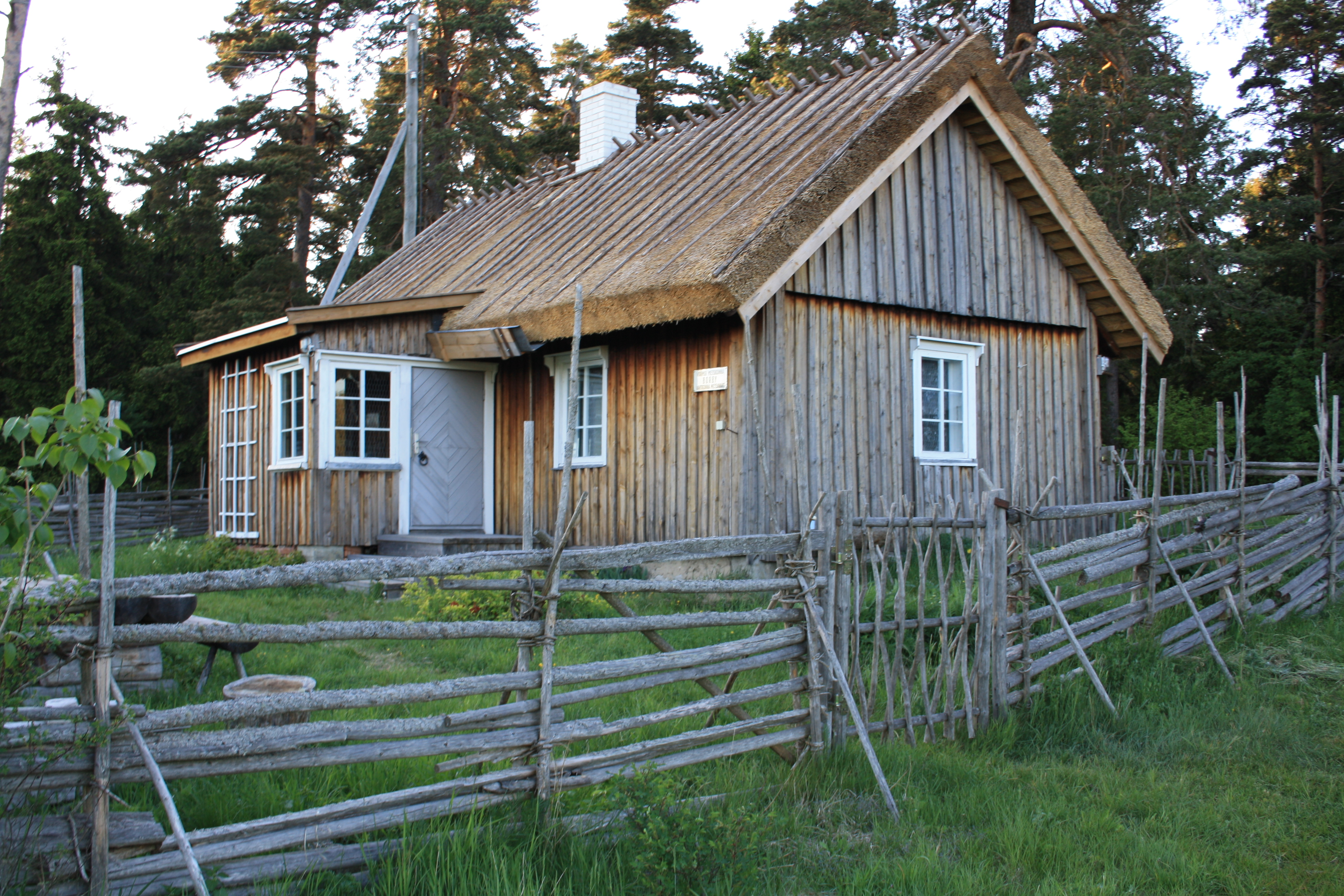
A cottage in Hullo

Hullo is a village on the fourth largest island of Estonia, Vormsi, in Lääne County, Estonia. It is the administrative centre of Vormsi Parish. The population of Hullo was estimated to be 245 as of January 1, 2010.

Island inhabitants date back to the 13th century. During most of its history the island was inhabited by Estonian Swedes ("rannarootslased" in Estonian, or "coastal Swedes" in English), whose population reached 3,000 before World War II. During the war, nearly all of Vormsi's population, including Hullo's; were evacuated to Sweden.

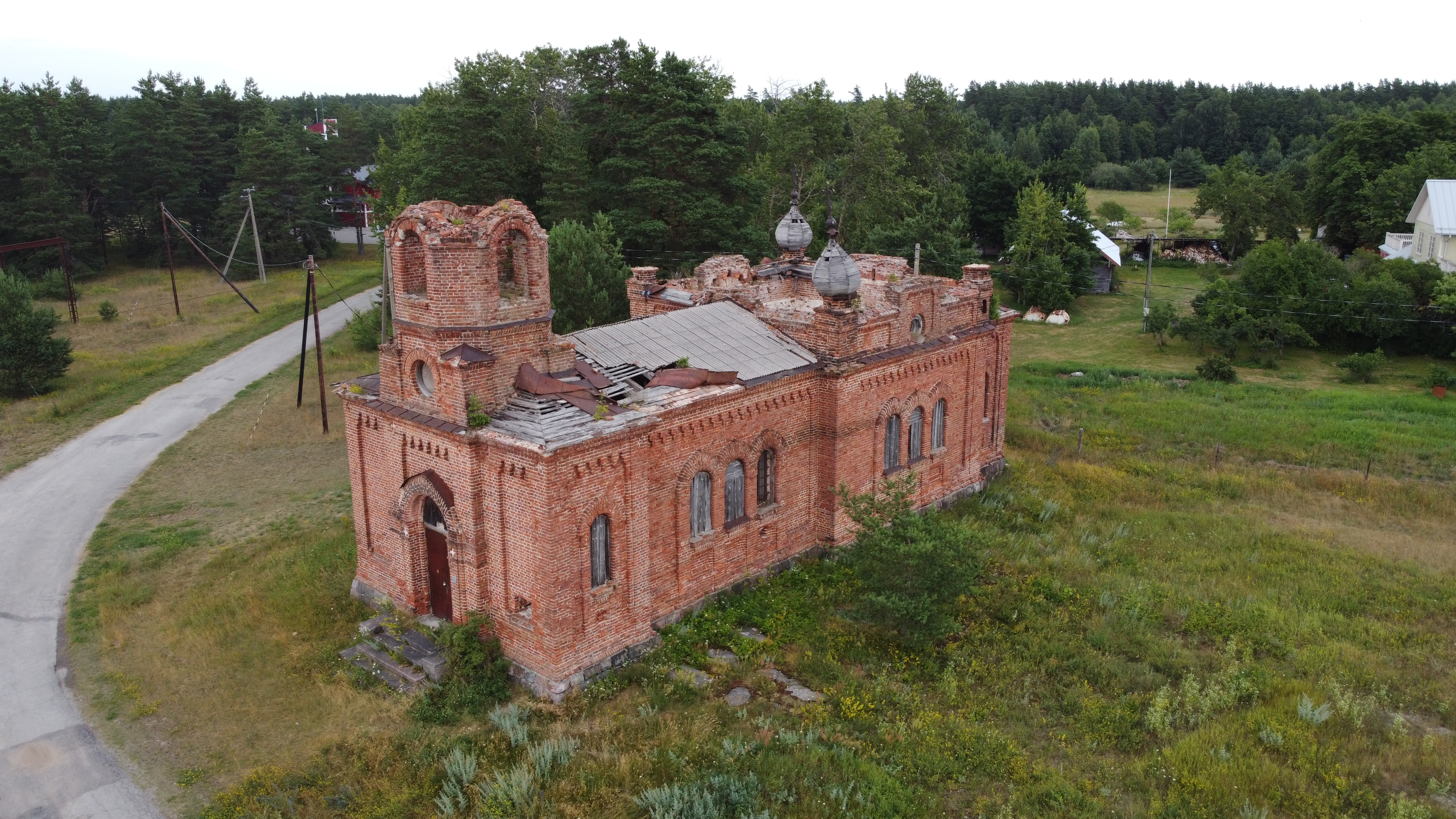
Vormsi Orthodox Church

Two churches are located on the island: a protestant church and an orthodox church.

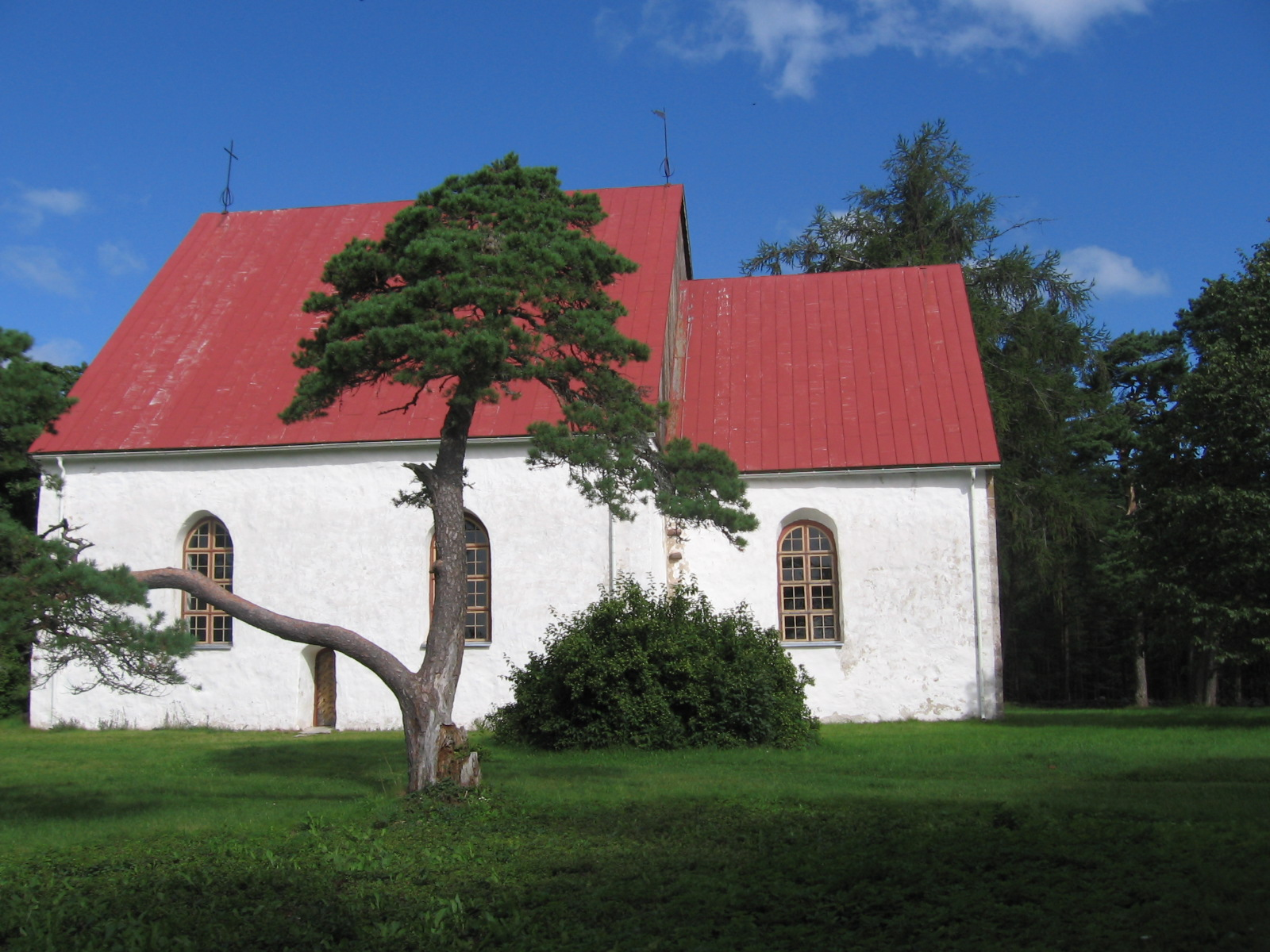
Vormsi Olavi Church in Hullo

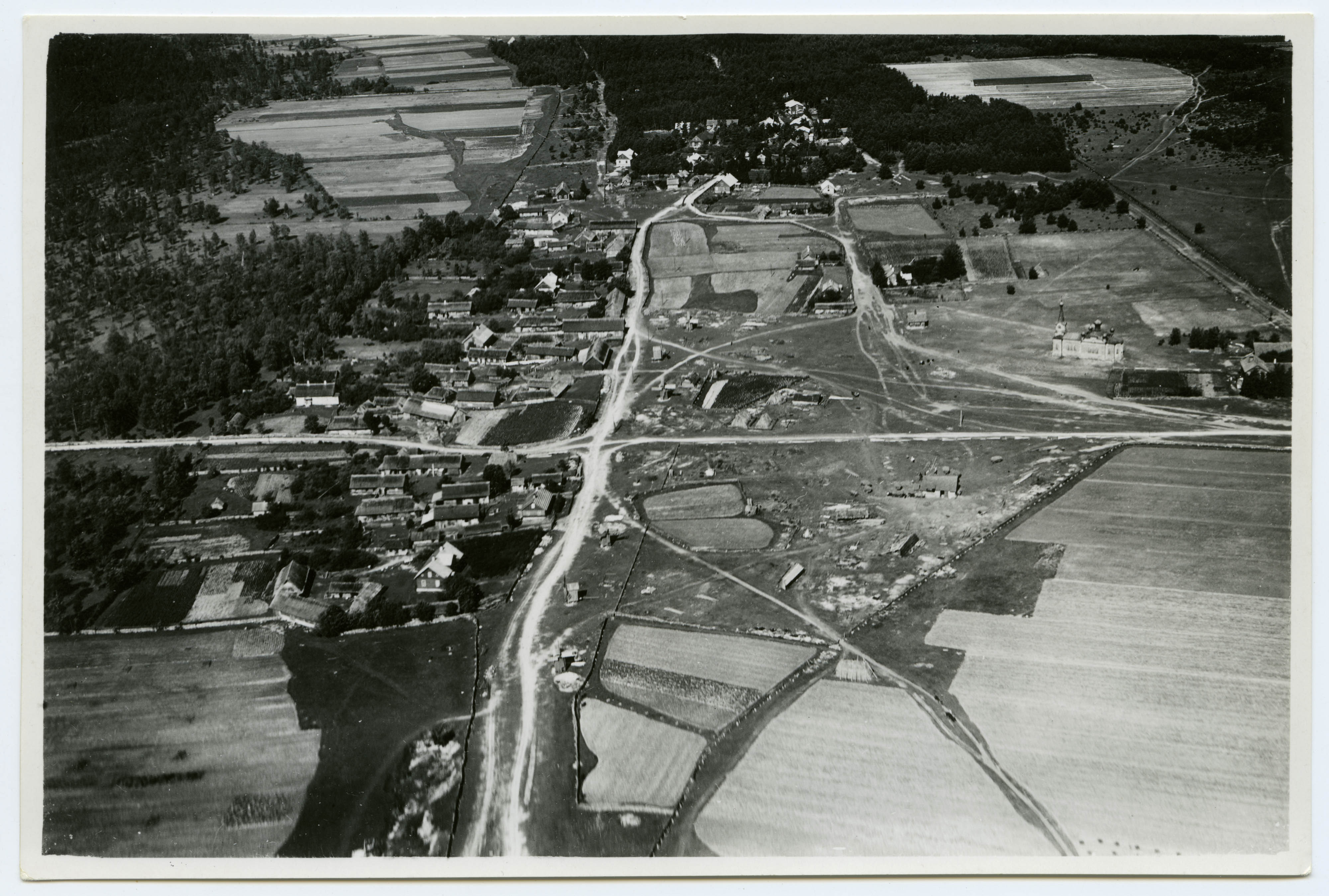
Aerial photo of Hullo in 1934
