= Rälby =

Village in Estonia

Coordinates: 59°01′N 23°17′E

- Village
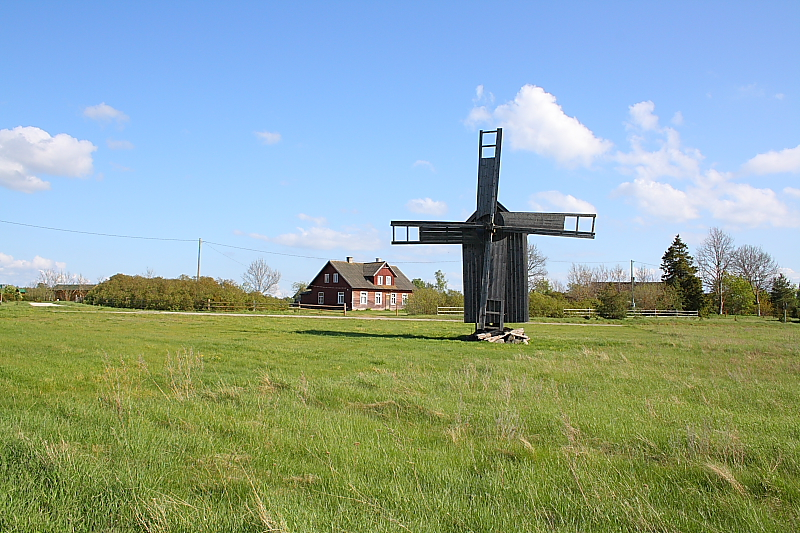
- Windmill in Rälby.
- Interactive map of Rälby
- Country: Estonia
- County: Lääne County
- Parish: Vormsi Parish
- Time zone: UTC+2 (EET)
  - Summer (DST): UTC+3 (EEST)

Rälby is a village in Vormsi Parish, Lääne County, in western Estonia.

== Gallery ==
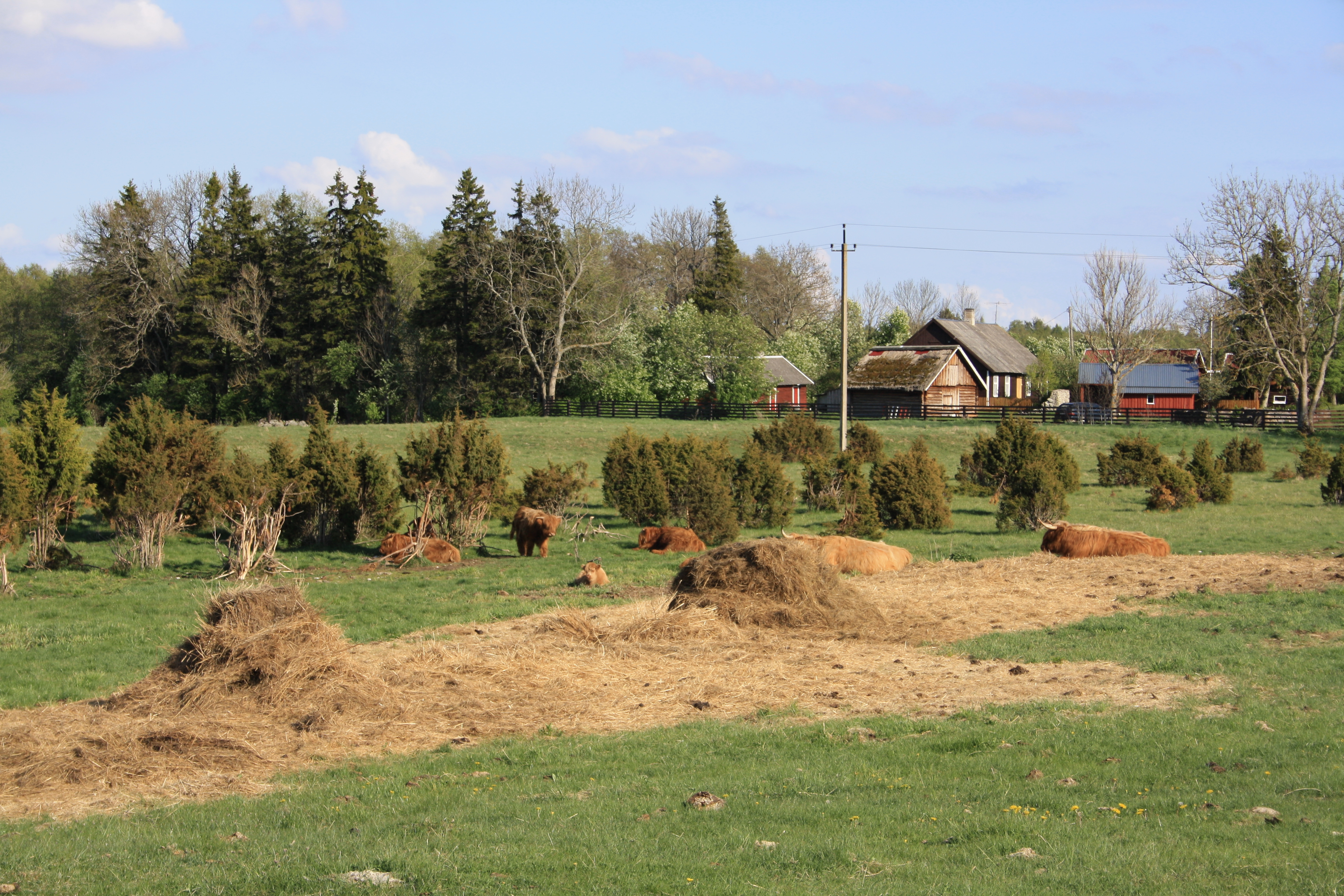
Cows

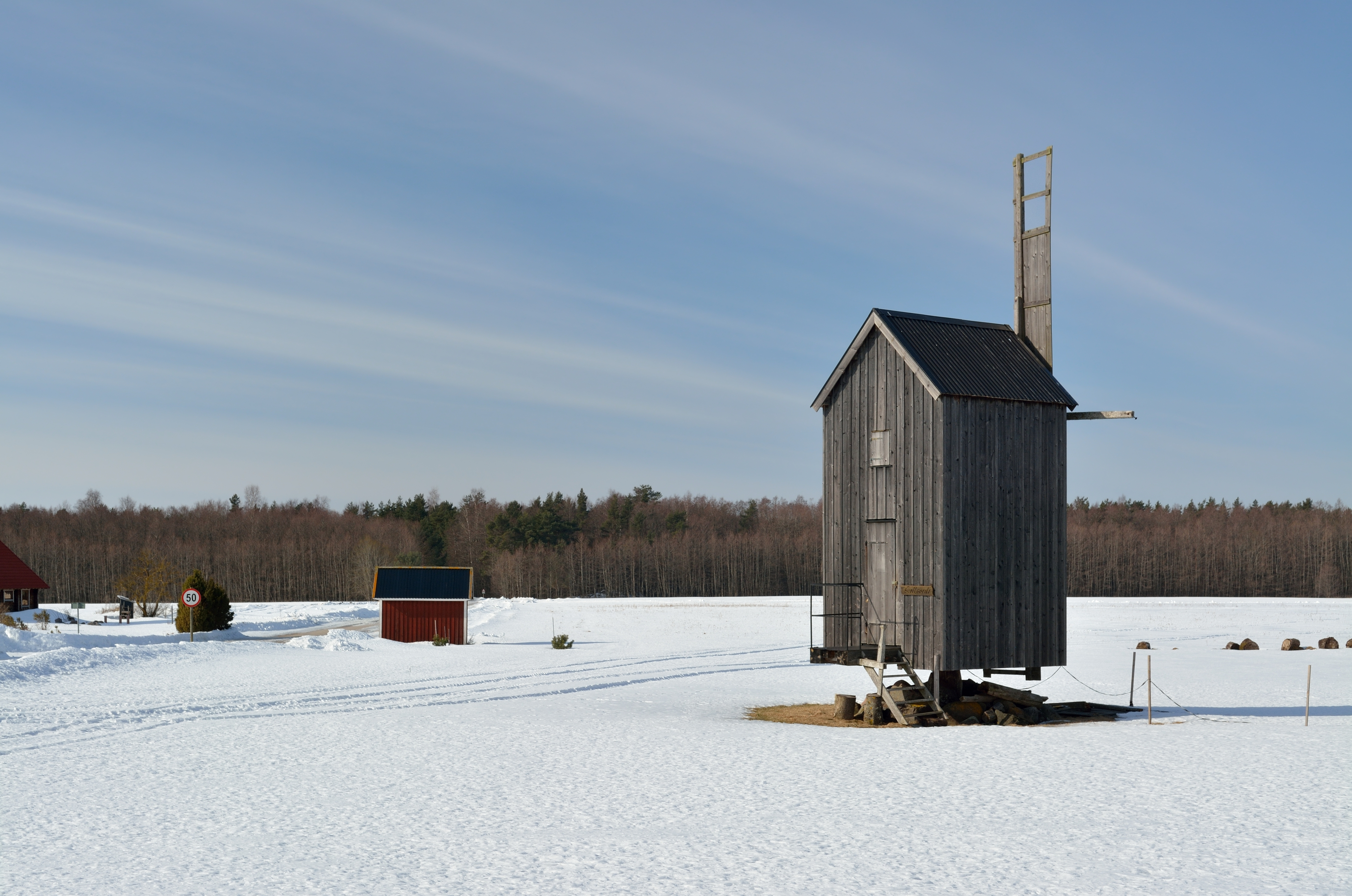
Windmill

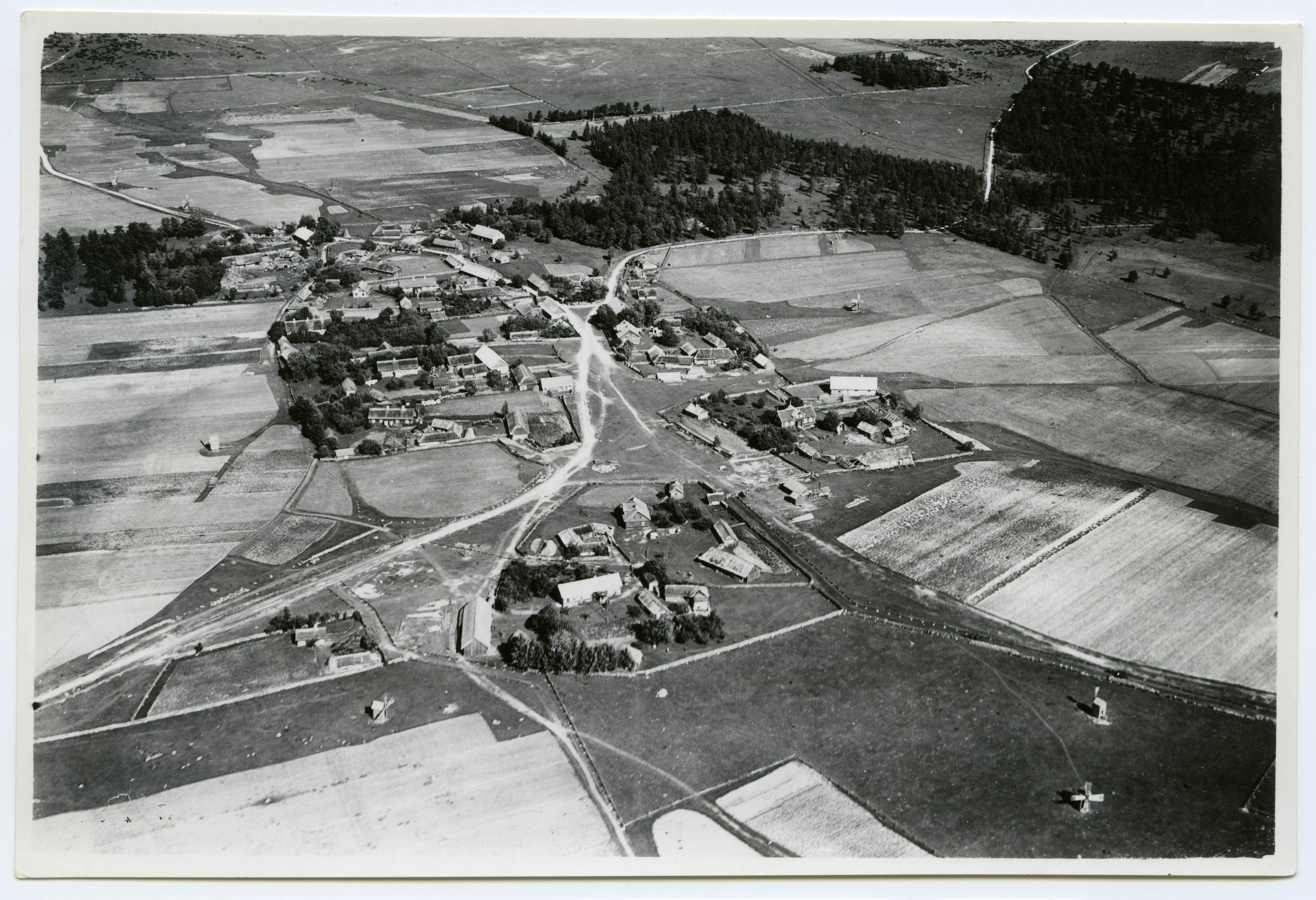
Rälby in 1934
