= Mind Transfer (novel) =

Science fiction novel written by Janet Asimov

- First edition
- Author: Janet Asimov
- Cover artist: Alex Niño
- Language: English
- Genre: Soft science fiction, first contact, mind uploading fiction, political novel
- Publisher: Walker Publishing Company (New York)
- Publication date: 1988
- Publication place: United States
- Media type: Print (hardback & paperback)
- Pages: 312 pp (Hardcover edition)
- ISBN: 0-8027-6748-6 (Hardcover edition)
- OCLC: 17662265
- LC Class: PZ7.A836 Mi 1988

Mind Transfer is a science fiction novel by Janet Asimov (as Janet Jeppson Asimov), published by Walker Publishing Company, Inc. in 1988. The novel journeys through the birth, life, death, and second life of a man whose family pioneers human-to-android mind transfer. It also explores the ethical and moral issues of transferring consciousness into an android at the moment of death, and examines the idea of prematurely activating an android which has not yet accepted a human brain scan.

== Plot ==
The story begins as mind transferring has just been banned on Earth by right-wing biofundamentalists. Referred to as “bioeffers,” these terrorists oppose the work of Jonathan Durant, who comes from a dynasty of scientists working to perfect transferring human minds to robot bodies. As bioeffers storm the Durant facilities, Jonathan's wife, Bess, gives birth to a son she names Adam with the help of the family’s domestic robot. As the new family flees, Jonathan is murdered by a police officer. Bess, her son, and the robot manage to find safe passage to the orbital space colony of Centauria in an adjacent solar system.

On Centauria, the robot assistant reveals that Jonathan is alive within him as the first successful mind transfer. The family members raise Adam and work with other scientists on Centauria to improve both robot and mind transfer technology. As their work develops they create an even more intelligent robot named Jonwon.

Adam matures, falls in love, and goes to medical school to study the psychiatry of mind transfers. Some scientists attempt to return to Earth to share the knowledge of mind transfer. Nevertheless, tensions continue between Earth and Centauria and culminate in a terrorist attack that damages Centauria’s communications. The scientists on Earth believe Centauria has been destroyed until the robots and scientists on Centauri develop a new faster-than-light ship to send news of their safety back to Earth.

Ultimately, Jonwon grows increasingly disaffected with the state of human-robot relations and steals the faster-than-light ship to travel to the planet of Far. The original cast of characters by now has transferred their minds to robots and pursue Jonwon to discover that Far contains a planetary ocean which emits mind-altering waves. As the protagonists navigate the dangers of the ocean they discover another race of intelligent beings that have also been creating robots of their own.

== Reception ==
The book’s reception was lukewarm, receiving praise for its exploration and complication of the original Laws of Robotics. Kirkus Reviews found the book filled with too much dialogue and poorly paced.

== See also ==
- Mind uploading in philosophy and science
- Mind uploading in fiction
