= Hosby, Vormsi Parish =

Village in Estonia

Coordinates: 58°58′49″N 23°21′28″E

Hosby
- Village
- Interactive map of Hosby
- Country: Estonia
- County: Lääne County
- Parish: Vormsi Parish
- Time zone: UTC+2 (EET)
  - Summer (DST): UTC+3 (EEST)

Hosby is a village in Vormsi Parish, Lääne County, in western Estonia.
