= Söderby =

Village in Estonia

Coordinates: 59°00′15″N 23°20′58″E

- Village
- Interactive map of Söderby
- Country: Estonia
- County: Lääne County
- Parish: Vormsi Parish
- Time zone: UTC+2 (EET)
  - Summer (DST): UTC+3 (EEST)

Söderby is a village in Vormsi Parish, Lääne County, in western Estonia.
