= Sviby =

Village in Estonia

Coordinates: 58°59′N 23°18′E

- Village
- Interactive map of Sviby
- Country: Estonia
- County: Lääne County
- Parish: Vormsi Parish
- Time zone: UTC+2 (EET)
  - Summer (DST): UTC+3 (EEST)

Aerial view of Sviby and the island Vormsi

Sviby is a village in Vormsi Parish, Lääne County, in western Estonia.
