= Borrby, Estonia =

Village in Estonia

Coordinates: 59°02′N 23°14′E

Borrby
- Village
- Interactive map of Borrby
- Country: Estonia
- County: Lääne County
- Parish: Vormsi Parish
- Time zone: UTC+2 (EET)
  - Summer (DST): UTC+3 (EEST)

Borrby is a village in Vormsi Parish, Lääne County, in western Estonia. Borrby has only four inhabitants today (31 December 2011).

== Gallery ==
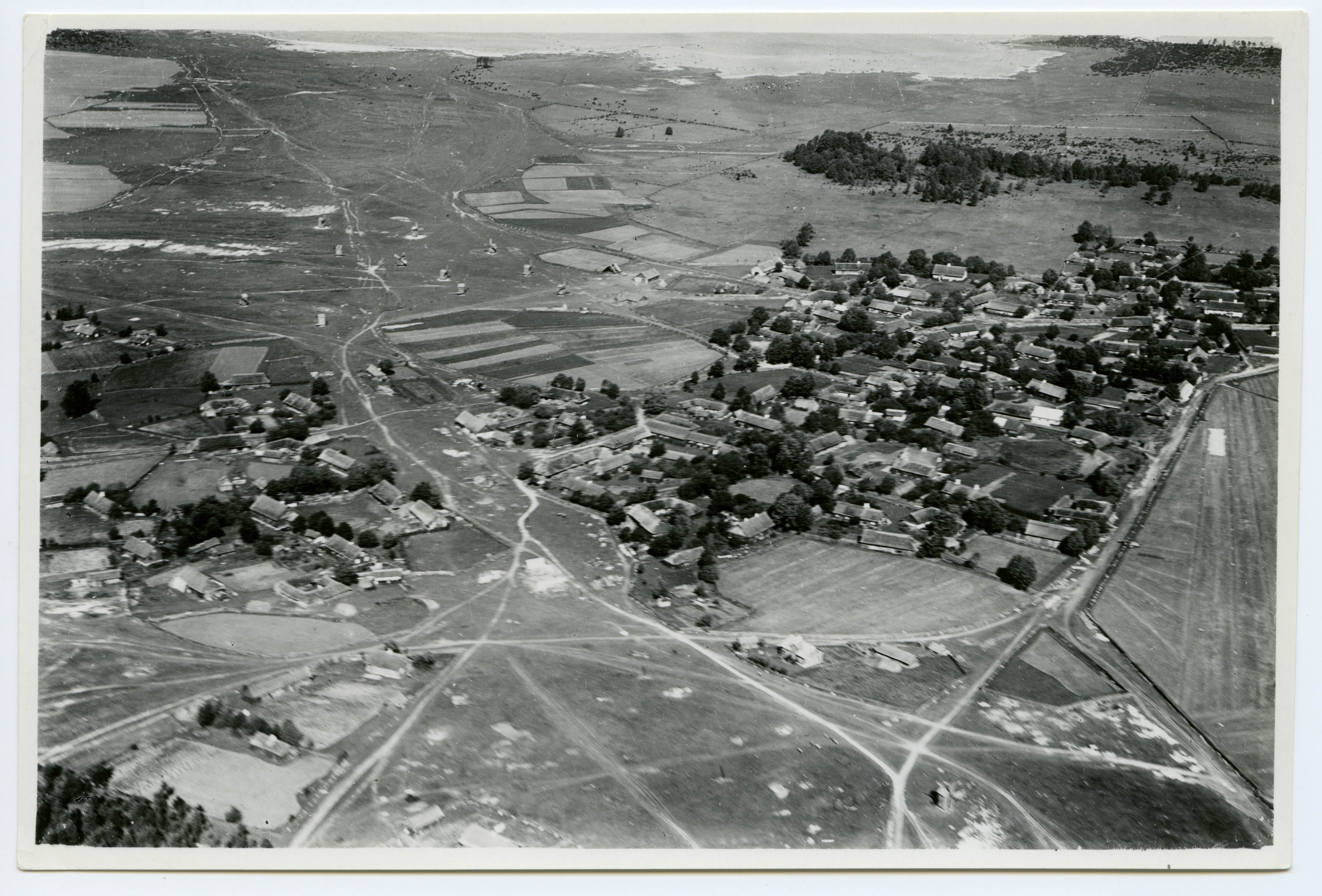
Borrby (Borbi küla) in 1934
