= Suuremõisa, Lääne County =

Village in Estonia

Coordinates: 58°59′N 23°11′E

Suuremõisa
- Village
- Interactive map of Suuremõisa
- Country: Estonia
- County: Lääne County
- Parish: Vormsi Parish
- Time zone: UTC+2 (EET)
  - Summer (DST): UTC+3 (EEST)

Suuremõisa, also "Magnushof" and formerly "Bussby"' is a village in Vormsi Parish, Lääne County, in western Estonia.
