= Rumpo =

Village in Estonia

Coordinates: 58°58′N 23°16′E

- Village
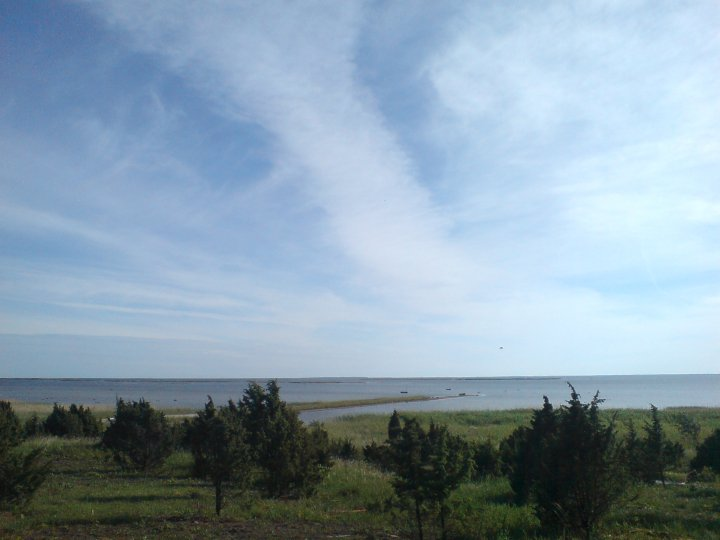
- Interactive map of Rumpo
- Country: Estonia
- County: Lääne County
- Parish: Vormsi Parish
- Time zone: UTC+2 (EET)
  - Summer (DST): UTC+3 (EEST)

Rumpo is a village in Vormsi Parish, Lääne County in western Estonia.
