= Kersleti =

Village in Estonia

Coordinates: 59°02′N 23°10′E

- Village
- Interactive map of Kersleti
- Country: Estonia
- County: Lääne County
- Parish: Vormsi Parish
- Time zone: UTC+2 (EET)
  - Summer (DST): UTC+3 (EEST)

Kersleti (Swedish: Kärrslätt) is a village in Vormsi Parish, Lääne County, in western Estonia.

== Pictures ==
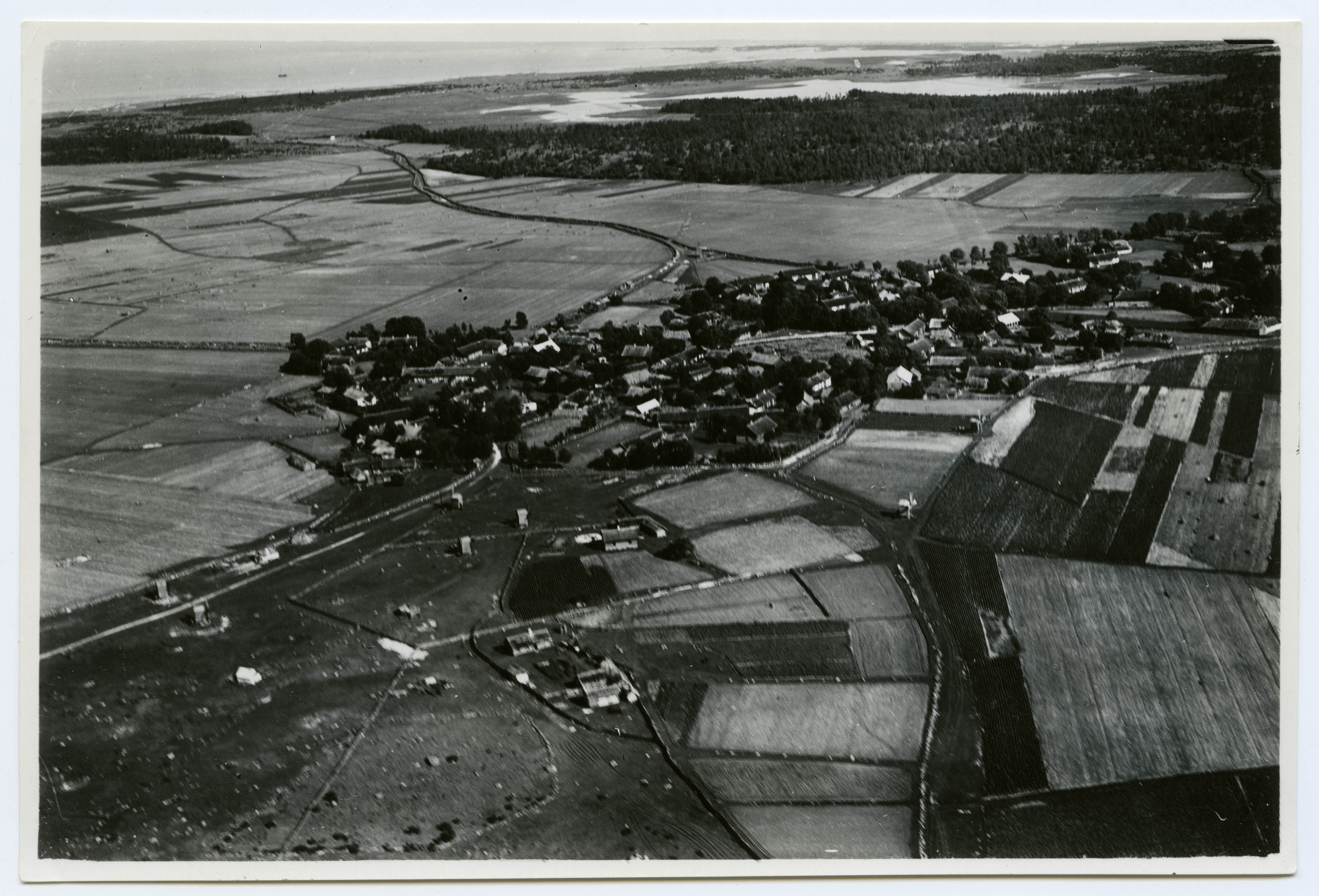
Kersli küla (Kerrslätt) in 1934

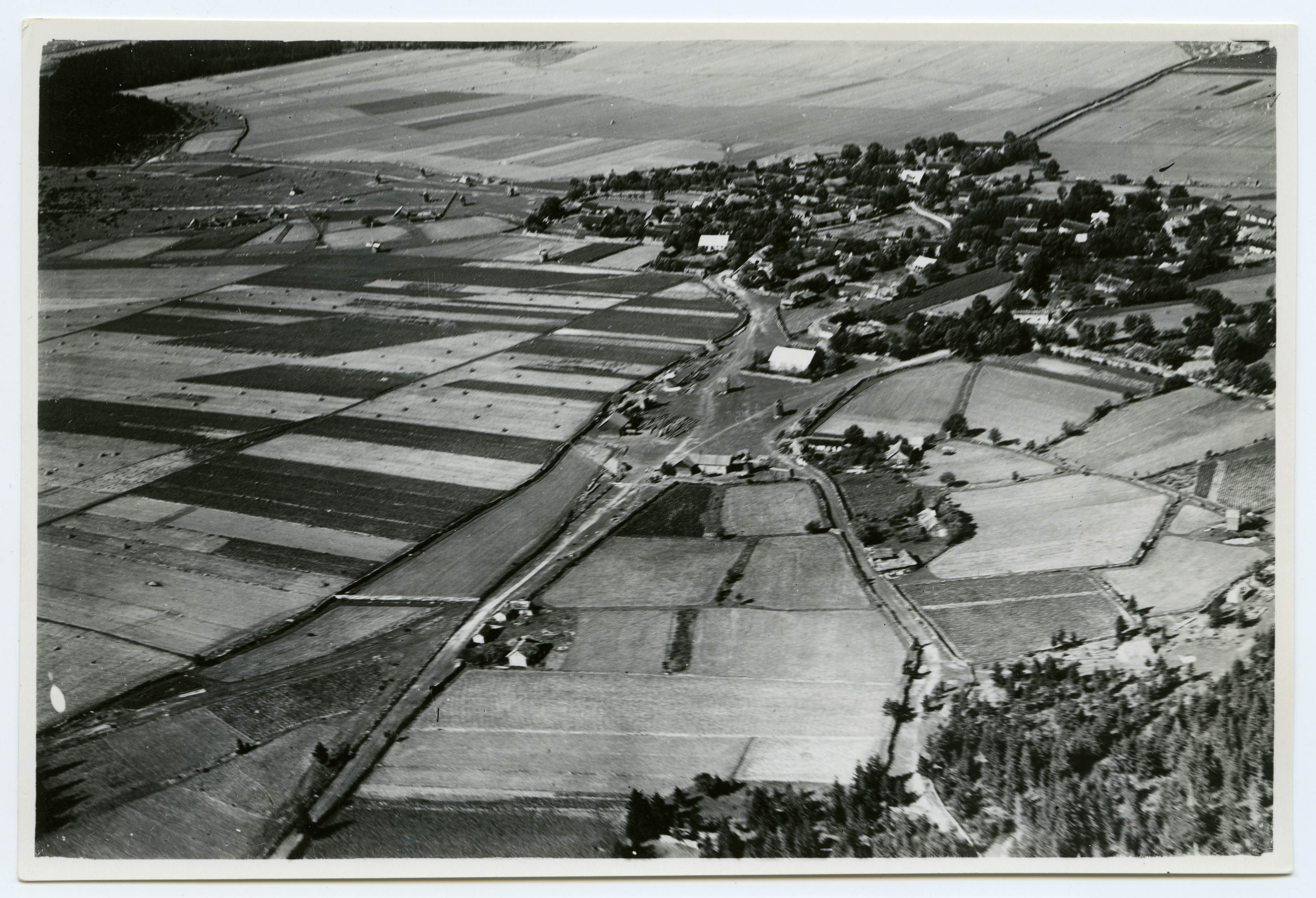
Kersli küla (Kerrslätt) in 1934
