= Norby, the Mixed-Up Robot =

1983 book by Janet and Isaac Asimov

- First edition (publ. Walker Books); Cover by Anthony Accardo
- Author: Janet and Isaac Asimov
- Publisher: Walker & Co.
- Publication date: September 1983
- ISBN: 978-0-802-76495-9

Norby, the Mixed-Up Robot (1983, Walker & Company) is the first book in the Norby series by American authors Janet Asimov and Isaac Asimov. In it, Jefferson Wells and Norby stop Ing from taking over the Solar System with the help of Jeff's brother Fargo Wells, police officer Albany Jones, and Admiral Boris Yobo. According to Isaac Asimov, although Janet Asimov did 90% of the work, his "name was wanted on the book for the betterment of sales [and he] went over the manuscript and polished it a bit." It, along with its sequel, was illustrated for Boys' Life.

== Plot summary ==
The book starts with Jeff Wells, a cadet at a military academy on Mars in need of a teaching robot, for although he is not flunking, his substandard grades have caused concern for Agent Two Gidlow, who has also pointed out that the Wells family has lost their fortune and his tuition is overdue, ergo termination is recommended. The more sympathetic commandant, Admiral Yobo, permits Jeff to remain in the academy, being well aware of the hardships of the Wellses, and gives Jeff a credit voucher to buy a robot. As the academy has ended for summer, Jeff returns to Earth, where he buys a small, fat robot only to discover that it has the only mini-anti-gravity device in existence. The robot reveals he was owned many years ago by a man named MacGillicuddy, who found him in a wrecked spaceship, then used his parts to repair a damaged robot of his own, hence his comical shape. MacGillicuddy called the robot "Macko", but the robot says he didn't like this name. Jeff, seeing the old label on the stainless steel barrel used for the robot's body, proclaiming it contained "Norb's Nails" suggests calling him "Norby" and Norby agrees.

Norby and Jeff go to the park where the evil villain Ing's henchmen are after Fargo Wells, Jeff's brother. Norby and Jeff stop the henchmen who are captured by the police. The policewoman in charge of the squad identifies herself as Albany Jones, whom Fargo knew from his days at Neil Armstrong High School. Ing manages to take over Manhattan Island, renaming it the "Kingdom of Ing", but Norby and Jeff start a revolt against him with the aid of a dowdy woman whom they save from being arrested. However, as Ing's soldiers are about to capture Jeff, Norby absconds using a hyperdrive, never before done and creating a subplot for the second book in the series Norby's Other Secret, as they end up on an alien planet named Jamya. Norby uses the hyperdrive to return to Earth, where they enlist Admiral Yobo in their quest to stop Ing. The trio takes Admiral Yobo's ship, but Norby warns that his hyperspace ability does not guarantee a successful infiltration of the Kingdom of Ing, to which Jeff sternly orders Norby to push forward. The hyperdrive literally causes Yobo's ship to hover above Ing's head, forcing him to a humiliating surrender. After unmasking Ing, he is revealed to be Agent Gidlow, who held a longtime grudge against Jeff and Fargo's family. The book ends with Fargo restoring the family fortune, and Albany Jones earning a promotion, as well as starting a relationship with Fargo. Jeff ends the story saying Norby is his Mixed-Up Robot.

== Audio version ==
A vinyl LP recording of Chapters 1 and 2 of Norby, the Mixed-Up Robot was released in 1986 by Caedmon Records. It was recorded by actor Mark Hamill. He has stated that he does not recall recording the tracks.
