= Norby =

- The Norby Chronicles character
- Norby as he appears in his first comic strip series, in Boys' Life, January 1990
- First appearance: Norby, the Mixed-Up Robot
- Last appearance: Norby and the Terrified Taxi
- Created by: Janet Asimov; Isaac Asimov

In-universe information
- Nickname: Seeker
- Species: Robot
- Gender: Male
- Family: Mentor One (original creator); Jeff Wells (owner)
- Nationality: Jamya (planet)

Norby is a fictional robot created by Janet Asimov and Isaac Asimov who stars in his own series of children's science fiction books, The Norby Chronicles. His first appearance was in the 1983 book Norby, the Mixed-Up Robot, in total he appeared in 11 novels in the 'Norby' series. According to Isaac Asimov, although Janet Asimov did 90% of the work, his "name was wanted on the book for the betterment of sales [and he] went over the manuscript and polished it a bit."

== Novels in the Norby series ==
1. Norby, the Mixed-Up Robot (1983)
2. Norby's Other Secret (1984)
3. Norby and the Lost Princess (1985)
4. Norby and the Invaders (1985)
5. Norby and the Queen's Necklace (1986)
6. Norby Finds a Villain (1987)
7. Norby Down to Earth (1989)
8. Norby and Yobo's Great Adventure (1989)
9. Norby and the Oldest Dragon (1990)
10. Norby and the Court Jester (1991)
11. Norby and the Terrified Taxi (1997) (written alone by Janet Asimov, after her husband's death)

=== Collections ===
The 'Norby' novels were combined into collections (each with a new cover image and title) by Ace Books:

- The Norby Chronicles (featuring 'Norby, the Mixed-Up Robot', and 'Norby's Other Secret'.)
- Norby: Robot for Hire (featuring 'Norby and the Lost Princess', and 'Norby and the Invaders'.)
- Norby Through Time and Space (featuring 'Norby and the Queen's Necklace', and 'Norby Finds a Villain'.)

== Origin, appearance, and abilities ==
Norby was originally a robot named the Searcher, created by the robot Mentor First on the planet Jamya. When the Mentor's robots were in danger of deactivation due to exhausting their fuel, the Searcher was deployed in order to find a promised refueling ship sent by the Others, the creators of the Mentors. The small robot succeeded in locating the ship, but before he could warp it back to Jamya, it crashed in Earth's asteroid belt. The impact of the crash also rendered the Searcher immobile, until the ship was discovered many years later by a salvager and inventor named McGillicuddy. McGillicuddy was a robot maker himself, albeit his were of cruder design than the Mentor's. One of his damaged robots was created from a tubby barrel that originally contained Norb's Nails, later becoming the basis for Norby's name. McGillicuddy used the Searcher's parts to repair his damaged robot. Norby eventually fell into the possession of a used-robot shop where he was sold to Jefferson Wells, a space cadet looking for a teaching robot.

Norby's body reflects his outer origins as a barrel, while his arms are retractable and have double-sided palms (and two thumbs). His head is round with four eyes, two on each side, and the top is a dome which he can retract into his barrel. His feet are also extendable/retractable. Norby has a tenor voice but can communicate through telepathy by touch.

Norby is equipped with a miniature anti-gravity device allowing him to float. He also possesses the ability to travel through hyperspace, although his navigating abilities are sometimes unreliable. He also has the capability to travel through time via hyperspace. Norby's many features make him a target for scientists, the army, and the rogue Inventor's Guild who wish to disassemble and study him.

== Heroic feats ==
In the first Norby book, Norby, the Mixed-Up Robot, Norby and his owner Jefferson Wells stop the villain Ing the Ingrate from taking over the Solar System.

In the second book, Norby's Other Secret, Norby and Jeff travel to the planet Jamya to restore the mental health of Norby's creator, Mentor First. Along the way they learn about the Others, a race that bio-engineered the intelligent Jamyn dragons.

The third book, Norby and the Lost Princess, introduces the planet Izz and its displaced human settlers. While Norby and company prepare for a singing contest, they go to Izz where they find out that Princess Rinda has taken the only Izzian hyperspace ship to Melodia. Norby, Jeff, Fargo, Yobo, and Albany go to the planet on a rescue mission only to be imprisoned by the native insect life.

The fourth book, Norby and the Invaders, pits Norby and Jeff against a race of balloon-shaped aliens nicknamed the Invaders. The Invaders kidnap the Grand Dragon at the novel's outset and place her in an underwater zoo on their homeworld. An intelligent vine named the Dookoza attempts to thwart a rescue mission by Jeff and Norby, but they end up freeing the Grand Dragon and leaving the Dookoza on the planet Melodia.

The fifth book, Norby and the Queen's Necklace sends Norby and Jeff to the French Revolution using the Queen's Necklace, a time travel device that also involved Marie Antoinette in a scandal. After escaping the Bastille, Norby and Jeff take a Frenchman named Marcel on a wild romp through time as they attempt try to find the origin of the device. Jeff meets a council of the Others in this book.

The sixth book, Norby Finds a Villain introduces the character of Threezey the Clown, the alter ego of Ing. In this book, Ing/Threezey kidnaps Pera at a magic show and tries to use her to create a superbomb that will leave him as the only thing left in the universe. He instead opens a portal to another reality where the tree-like Master Cult (MC) rule, and accidentally bring them to the Solar System where they proceed to conquer Earth.

In the seventh book, Norby Down to Earth, Norby learns about his origins as well as the fate of the spacer McGillicuddy, who converted him to his current form.

The eighth book, Norby and Yobo's Great Adventure, finds Norby and Jeff stranded in ancient Africa with Admiral Yobo.

The ninth book, Norby and the Oldest Dragon, takes place almost entirely on the planet Jamya, which is being menaced by an attack from an intelligent cloud. The dragon in the title refers to the Dowager Dragon, mother of the Grand Dragon (the current ruler of Jamya).

The tenth book, Norby and the Court Jester, is set once more on the planet Izz and brings back the villain Ing for a third appearance.

The final book in the series, Norby and the Terrified Taxi, centers around Lizzie, an intelligent taxi first introduced in Norby Down to Earth. They must find and stop Garc the Great who wants to change history.

== Recurring characters ==
- Jefferson "Jeff" Wells: A 14-year-old cadet in the Space Academy, Jeff is Norby's "owner" and partner. Jeff originally purchases Norby, with the help of a loan from Admiral Yobo, to learn Martian Swahili for a class (Norby, the Mixed-Up Robot). His brother Fargo serves as his guardian, as their parents died when Jeff was only 10.
- Farley Gordon "Fargo" Wells: a secret agent for Admiral Boris Yobo of Space Command. Handsome, charming, musical, and a bit arrogant, he dates Albany Jones in the first book, and married her in later novels. Fargo is ten years older than Jeff and serves as his guardian.
- Admiral Boris Yobo: Jeff's commanding officer and Fargo's boss, Yobo has a big appetite for adventure and a larger one for food. Yobo originally gave Jeff the money to buy Norby from a used robot shop. Due to his high rank in Space Command, Yobo tends to become a quasi-liaison to whatever world Norby takes him.
- Albany Jones: A police officer and daughter of the Mayor of Manhattan. She fought Ing with the help of other police officers in the first novel and eventually marries Fargo.
- Zargl: A dragon from Jamya, Zargl is the great-niece of the Grand Dragon. Zargl, along with her mother Zi, are the very first dragons Jeff and Norby meet on their first trip to Jamya (Norby, the Mixed-Up Robot). Zargl has joined Jeff and Norby and some of their adventures outside of Jamya as well (particularly in Norby and the Lost Princess).
- Mentor First: An ancient Jamyn robot with three eyes and four arms, Mentor First constructed Norby as a way to contact his creators, the "Others," for supplies (Norby's Other Secret). Mentor First went insane for a long time, out of loneliness, worry, and lack of the ability to refuel, but eventually returned to full health thanks to Norby and Jeff. Norby refers to Mentor First as "Father."
- Rembrandt: A four armed, three eyed "Other" living in present time (Norby and Jeff have also met Others in the past and future), Rembrandt studies and creates visual art. He lives on a museum ship run by the computer Y.I.B., which stands for Your Immense Brain, a nickname Norby gave her. Jeff calls him Rembrandt, after the famed Renaissance artist, as his real name is unpronounceable to humans (Norby Finds a Villain).
- Rinda: The 11-year-old Crown Princess of Izz (a planet colonized by humans taken from Earth by the Others). Rinda used her royal influence to board Izz's first hyperspace ship and accidentally hit a button which took it to a planet she termed Melodia. The music-loving alien inhabitants of this planet fed Rinda to a sacred tree; she became part of the tree for a while but was later restored to her human self (Norby and the Lost Princess). She has a crush on Jeff.
- Pera: A robot similar to Norby, Pera was initially created by the Others to monitor the formation of the planet Melodia (Norby and the Lost Princess). Though Pera was intended to be crushed as Melodia formed, Norby and Jeff attempted to rescue her by taking her into hyperspace (due to an electronic field around the planet, Pera instead held onto her recording device as it went into hyperspace, saving Norby and Jeff instead). Pera stayed with Rinda on Izz as a companion. When she was kidnapped by Threezy/Ing, she opened an inter-dimensional portal allowing the Master Cult to take over the universe (Norby Finds a Villain). Pera is extremely observant and must always tell the truth.
- The Grand Dragon: The ruler of Jamya, the Grand Dragon is large, regal and loves nothing more to be praised.
- Lizzie: A floating, talking, and thinking taxicab who takes Norby and friends around Manhattan (Norby Down to Earth; Norby and the Terrified Taxi). Her circuits were adjusted by McGillicuddy, so she shares some origins with Norby.
- Oola: Jeff's all-purpose pet (Norby's Other Secret). She is green and normally looks like a cat but has the ability to shape-shift to fit the desires of those near her. Her species was bio-engineered by Mentor First. Oola is vegetarian.
- Ing/Threezy: The first villain of the series, Ing tries to take control of the Solar System with his band of Ingrates in Norby, the Mixed-Up Robot. After Norby stops his initial attempt, he later resurfaces as Threezy the Clown, intent on setting off a bomb in hyperspace and destroying the universe (Norby Finds a Villain). He ends up as Court Jester on the planet Izz (Norby and the Court Jester).

== Miscellany ==
It has been speculated that Norby was named by his authors after Norbert Wiener, the "Father of Cybernetics".

Note that in "Norby and the Lost Princess", King Fizzwell talks about a Spacecraft Challenger Disaster, more than one year before the real disaster occurred.

== Comics ==
A sample strip from the series from July 1991. Left frame, Norby. Right frame, left to right: Jeff, Albany, Norby, Yobo, Fargo.

The Norby Chronicles were made into serialization comics for the Scouting magazine Boys' Life in the 1990s. The comics were adapted from the first and second books in the series. The first was "Norby the Mixed-Up Robot" running for 18 chapters, from January 1990, to July 1991. The second series "Norby's Other Secret" ran from January 1993, to December 1995 and was presented in 32 chapters. The first chapter of each series being two full pages in length while the subsequent chapters were in one page.
