= Norrby, Estonia =

Village in Estonia

Coordinates: 59°07′N 23°32′E

Norrby
- Village
- Interactive map of Norrby
- Country: Estonia
- County: Lääne County
- Parish: Vormsi Parish
- Time zone: UTC+2 (EET)
  - Summer (DST): UTC+3 (EEST)

Norrby is a village in Vormsi Parish, Lääne County, in western Estonia.
