= Förby =

Village in Estonia

Coordinates: 59°00′N 23°09′E

- Village
- Interactive map of Förby
- Country: Estonia
- County: Lääne County
- Parish: Vormsi Parish
- Time zone: UTC+2 (EET)
  - Summer (DST): UTC+3 (EEST)

Förby is a village in Vormsi Parish, Lääne County, in western Estonia.
