= Swedes of Gammalsvenskby =

Swedish-speaking minority in Ukraine

Swedes of Gammalsvenskby Gammalsvenskbybor Svenskbybor
Regions with significant populations
- Gotland
- Ukraine: Gammalsvenskby 200

Languages
- Estonian Swedish; Gammalsvenska; Swedish; Ukrainian

Related ethnic groups
- Swedes; Estonian Swedes; Balts

The Swedes of Gammalsvenskby (Swedish: Svenskbybor) are descendants of the Estonian Swedes, a Swedish-speaking minority historically residing on the Baltic Sea island of Hiiumaa. In the 1780s, they were deported to the region of Novorossiya, where they established the village of Gammalsvenskby. Today, this village forms a neighbourhood of Zmiivka, Ukraine.

== Genetics ==
In 2017, as part of a DNA project led by a genetics professor at Uppsala University, researchers collected saliva samples from 25 people in Ukraine and from Gammalsvenskby descendants on the Swedish Baltic Sea island of Gotland in order to determine the genetic origin of the Swedish villagers in Gammalsvenskby. The preliminary results showed that the Swedish villagers were more genetically similar to Balts than other groups in Sweden.

== See also ==
- Swedish diaspora
