= Aiboland =

Historically Swedish-speaking areas of northwestern Estonia

Coordinates: 59°00′N 23°23′E

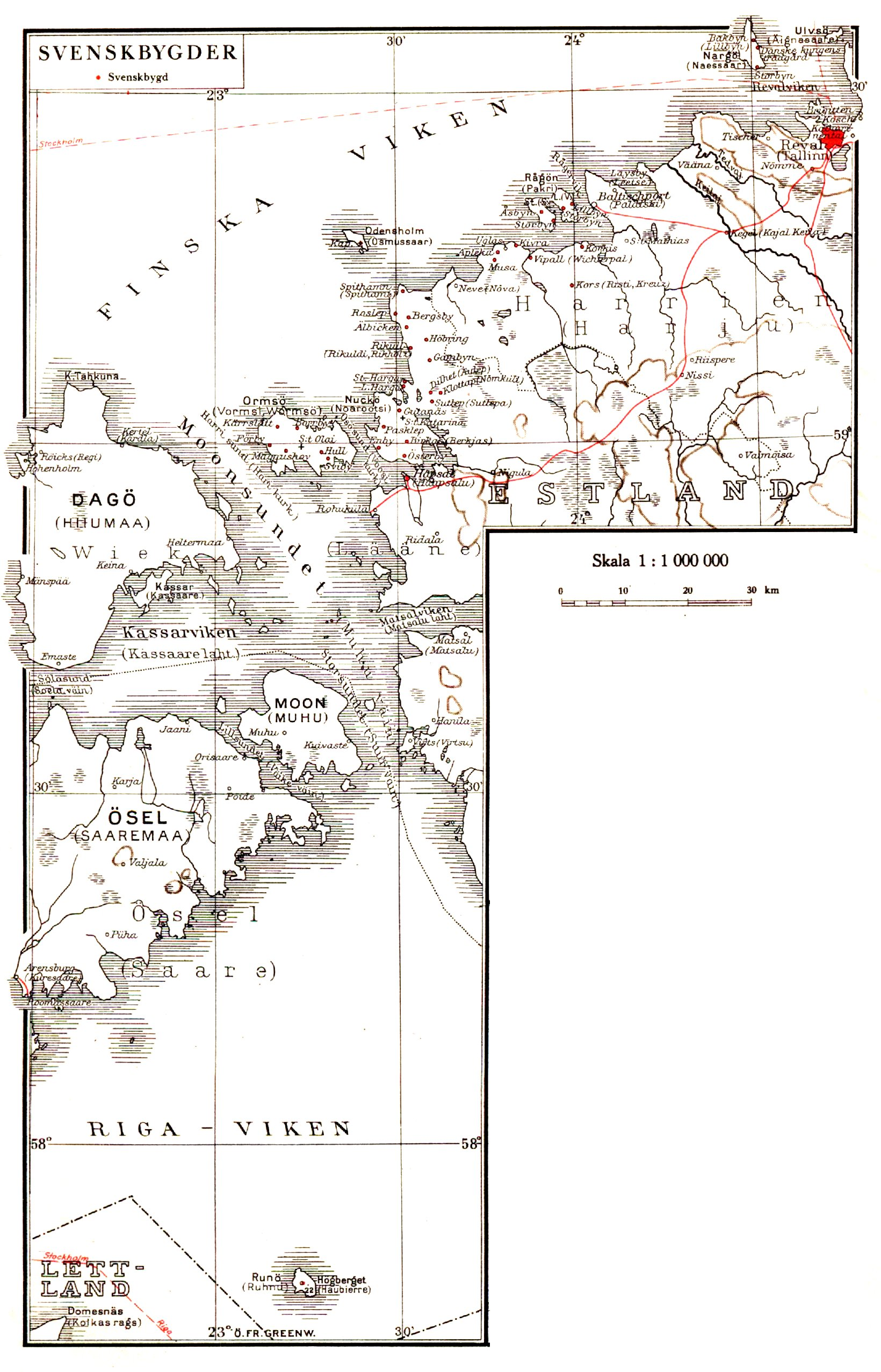
Aiboland 1930, indicating in red villages traditionally dominated by Swedish-speaking population ("svenskbygder").

Aiboland (also known as Swedish Estonia and Egeland) is the Estonian Swedish name for the historically Swedish-speaking areas and towns of northern and western Estonia.

Historical Aiboland encompasses Nuckö, Ormsö, Runö, Odensholm, Dagö, Ösel, Moon, Nargö, Rågöarna, and the towns around Hapsal on the Estonian mainland.

During World War II, in the summer of 1944, nearly all of the Estonian Swedes living in Aiboland fled to Sweden before the Red Army invaded the Baltic states.
