= Estonia–Sweden relations =

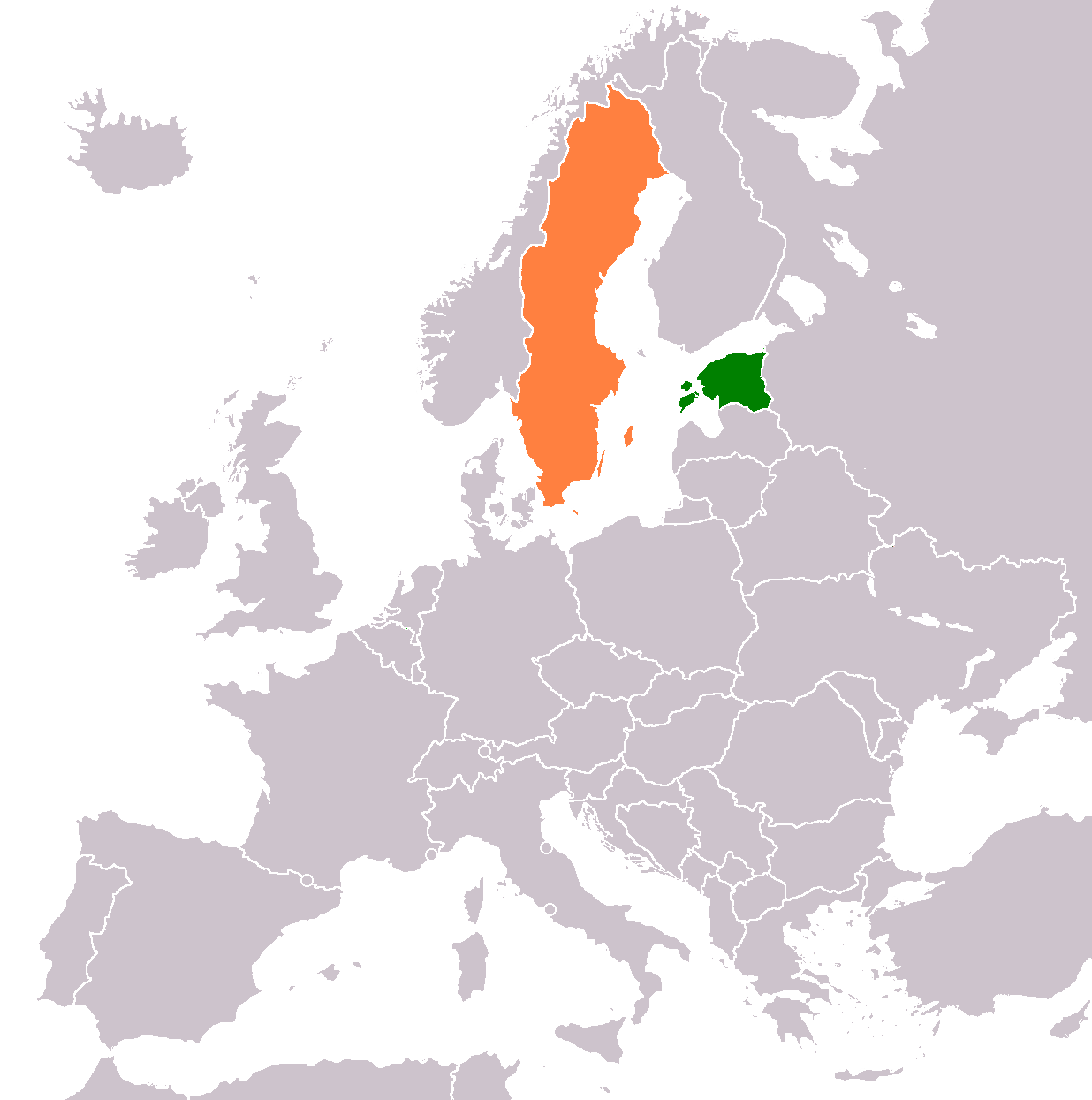
- Estonia: Sweden

Estonia–Sweden relations are the bilateral relations between the Republic of Estonia and the Kingdom of Sweden. Estonia has an embassy in Stockholm, whereas Sweden has an embassy in Tallinn.

Both countries are full members of the Council of the Baltic Sea States, Joint Expeditionary Force, European Union and NATO. Estonia strongly supported Sweden's NATO membership.

== History ==
Between 1561 and 1721, Estonia was wholly or partially under Swedish rule.

On 4 February 1921, Sweden recognized the Republic of Estonia as an independent and sovereign state.

In 1944, Sweden became one of the first among the few countries to recognize the Soviet occupation of the Baltic countries. In 1945, Stockholm extradited to the Soviet Union around 170 Waffen-SS-soldiers from the Baltic countries that had fled the Red Army and found refuge in Sweden. On 15 August 2011, Swedish Prime Minister Fredrik Reinfeldt officially offered an apology to the Prime Ministers of the Baltic states in a ceremony in Stockholm saying that "Sweden owes its Baltic neighbours a "debt of honour" for turning a blind eye to post-war Soviet occupation" and speaking of "a dark moment" in his country's history.

Sweden resumed diplomatic relations with Estonia on 28 August 1991.

== Bilateral visits ==
Since Estonia's independence, there have been many visits between leaders and senior officials from the two countries. In the last few years, the most important were:

To Sweden:

- January 2005 – Prime Minister of Estonia Juhan Parts
- May 2005 – Estonian Minister of Foreign Affairs Urmas Paet
- October 2005 – President of Estonia Arnold Rüütel
- August 2006 – Estonian Minister of Foreign Affairs Urmas Paet
- November 2006 – President of Estonia Toomas Hendrik Ilves
- September 2007 – President of Estonia Toomas Hendrik Ilves

To Estonia:

- 1925 and 1929 - King Gustaf V
- 1932 - Crown Prince Gustaf VI Adolf
- April 1992 – King Carl XVI Gustaf and Queen Silvia of Sweden
- 2002 – King Carl XVI Gustaf and Queen Silvia of Sweden
- February 2006 – Swedish Foreign Minister Laila Freivalds
- November 2006 – Swedish Foreign Minister Carl Bildt
- October 2007 – Queen Silvia of Sweden
- November 2007 – Prime Minister of Sweden Fredrik Reinfeldt
- May 2023 – King Carl XVI Gustaf and Queen Silvia of Sweden

== Resident diplomatic missions ==
- Estonia has an embassy in Stockholm.
- Sweden has an embassy in Tallinn.

== Gallery ==
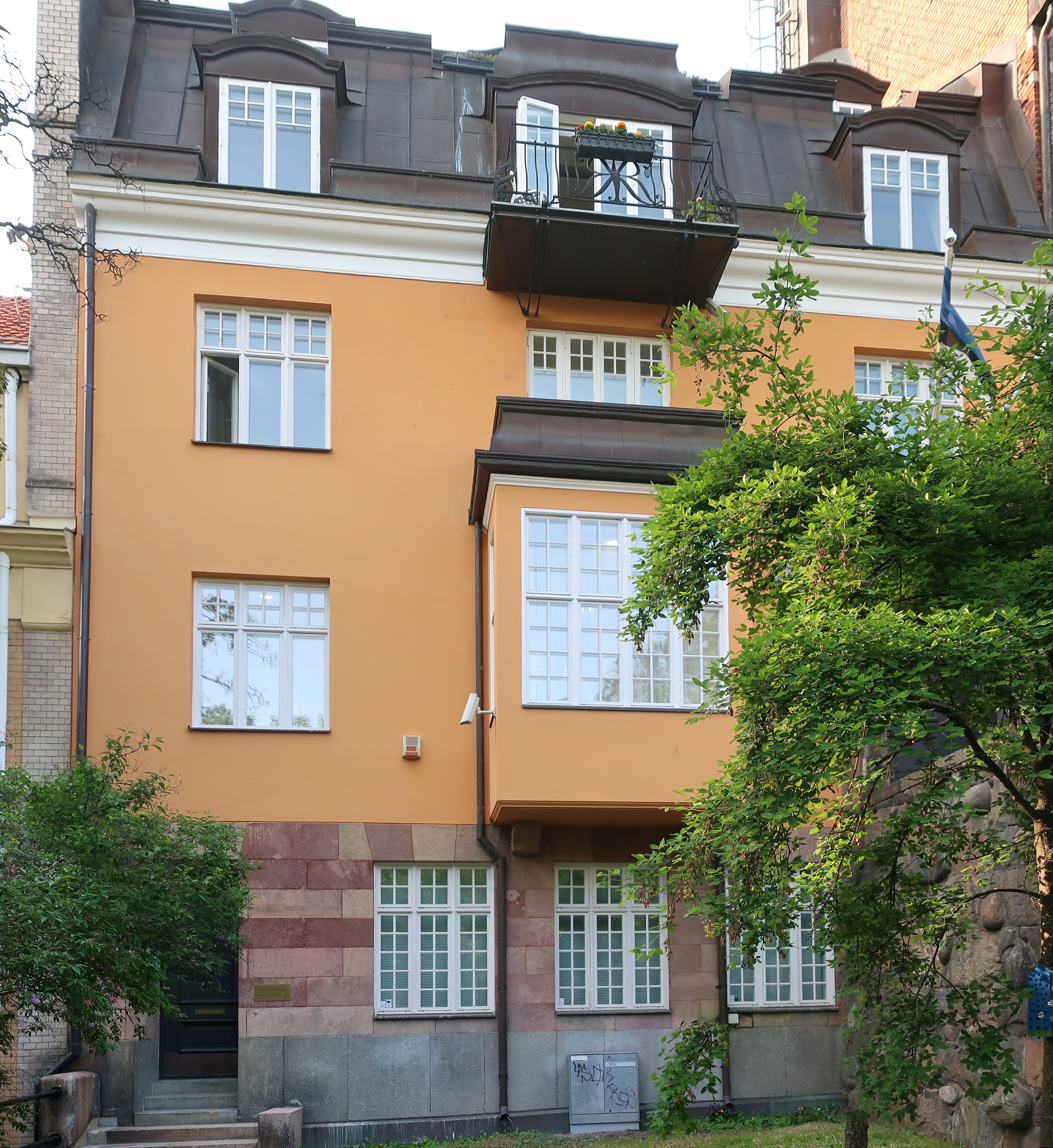
Embassy of Estonia in Stockholm

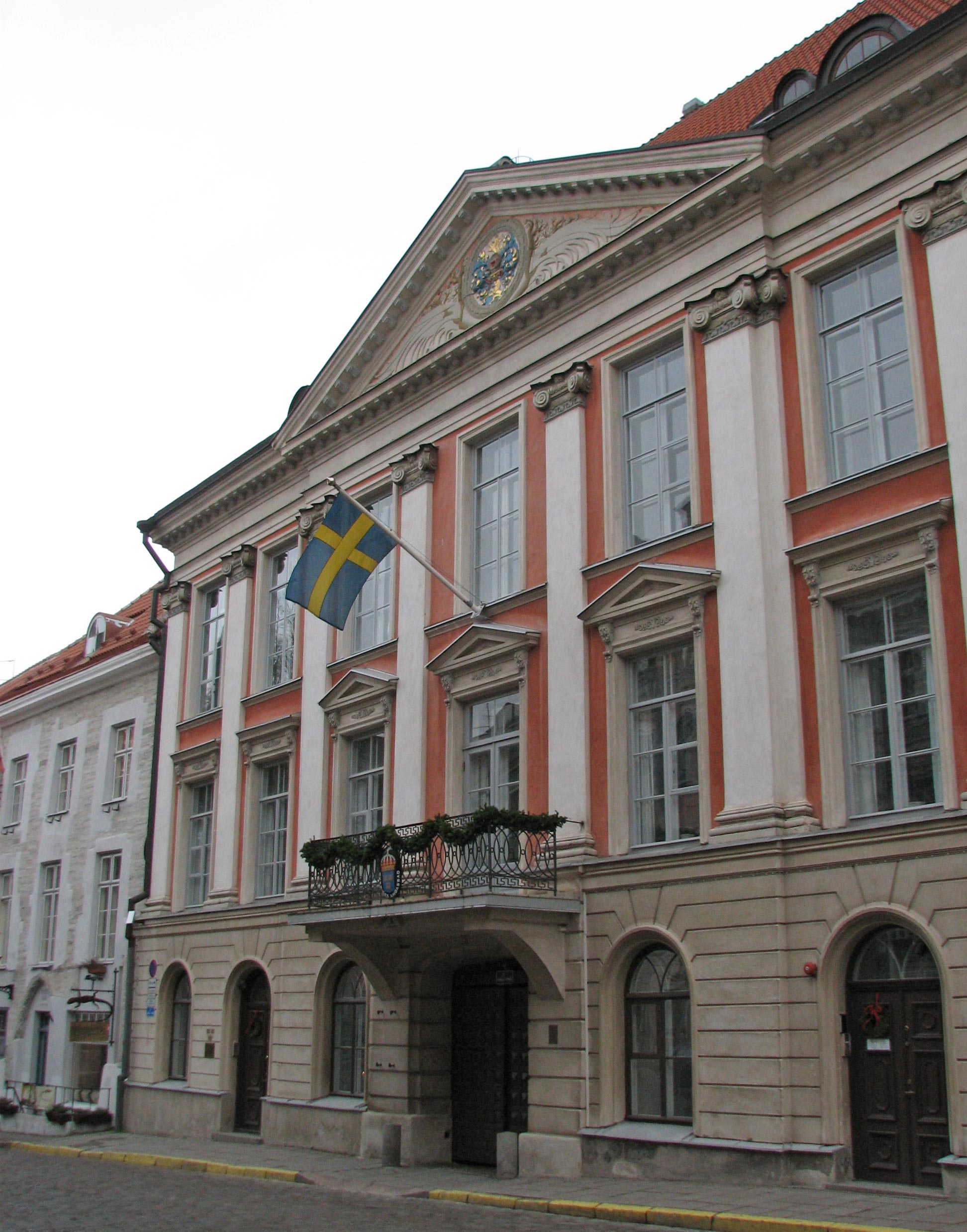
Embassy of Sweden in Tallinn

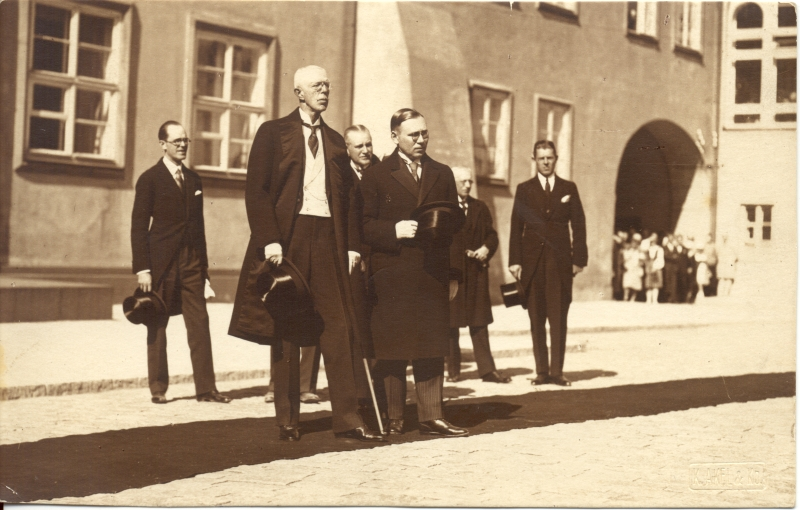
King Gustaf V of Sweden (left) and Estonian head of state August Rei (right) in Tallinn, 1929

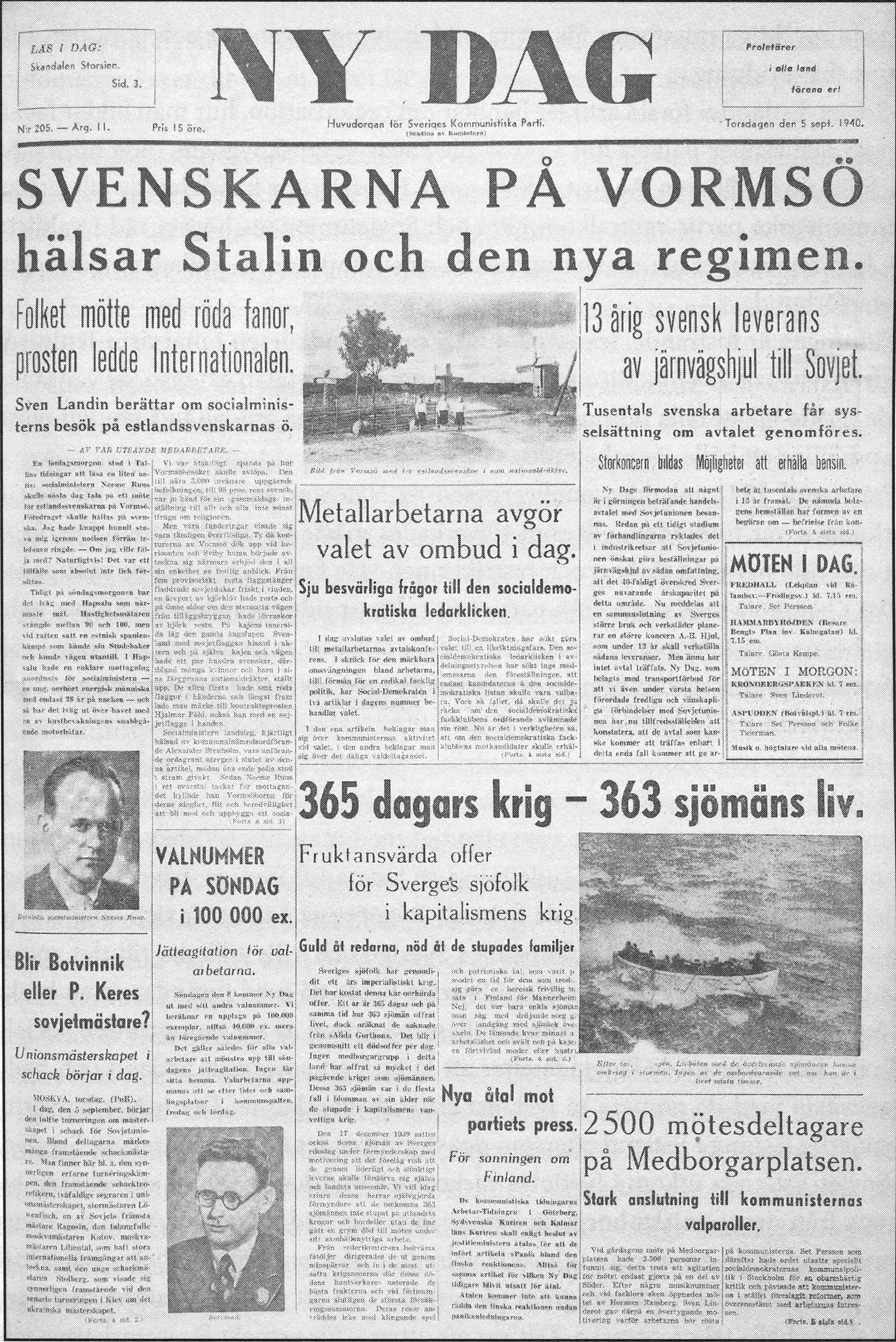
Swedish communist daily Ny Dag headline on 5 September 1940: "The Swedes on Vormsi greet Stalin and the new regime"

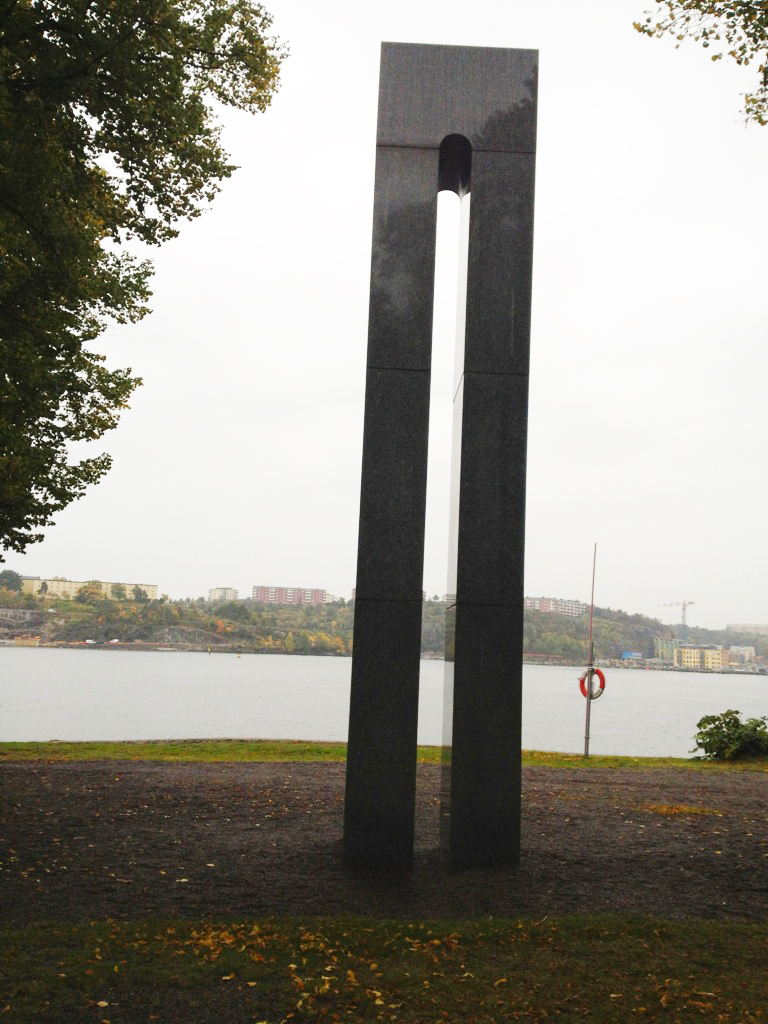
Frihetens port (The Freedom Gate) in Djurgården, Stockholm (monument to World War II refugees from Estonia in Djurgården, Stockholm).

== See also ==
- Foreign relations of Estonia
- Foreign relations of Sweden
- Swedish Estonia
- Swedish Livonia
- Estonian Swedes
- Estonian Swedish
- Nordic identity in Estonia
