= Languages of Ukraine =

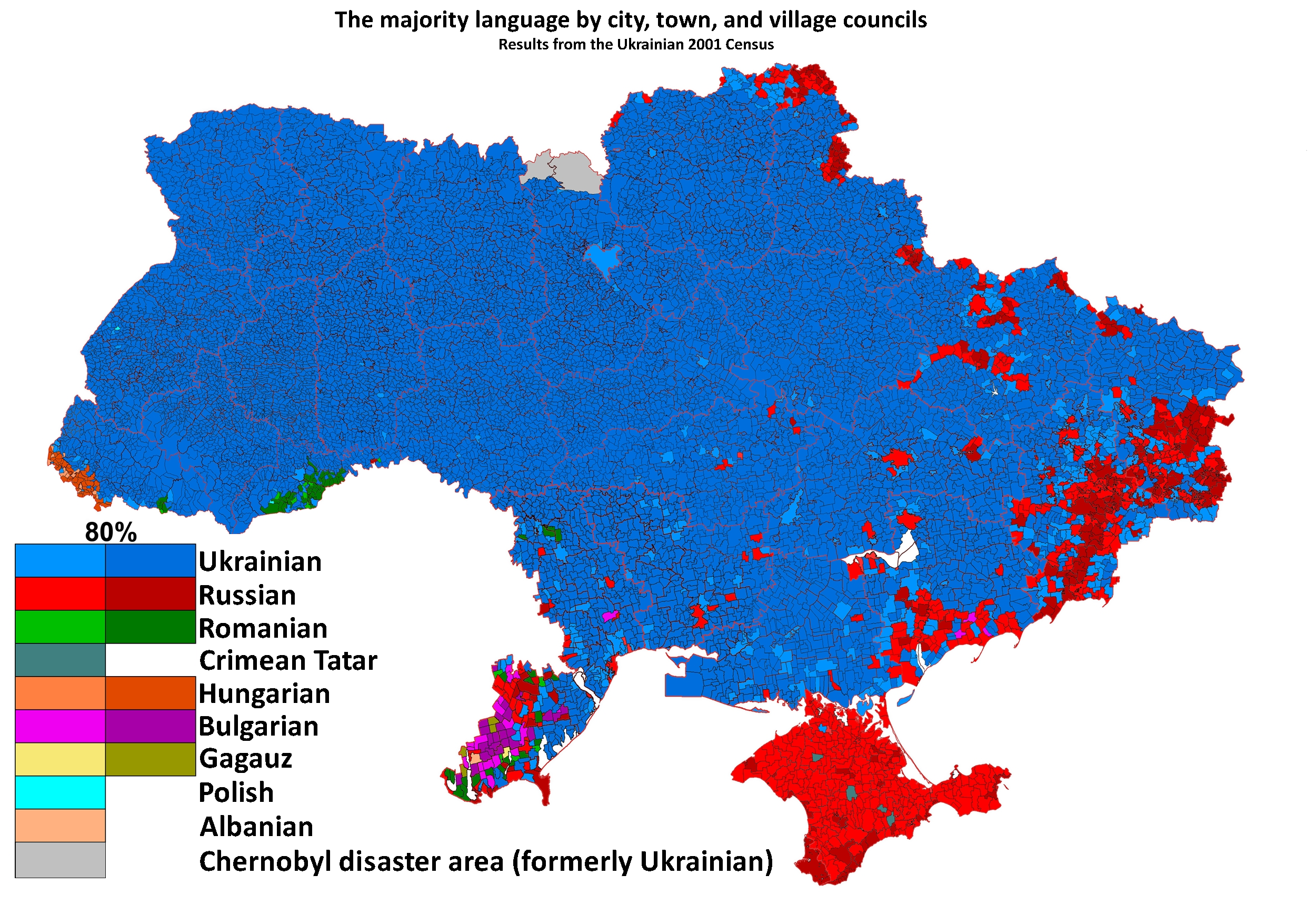
- Native languages in Ukraine, 2001 census
- Official: Ukrainian
- Indigenous: Crimean Tatar, Krymchak, Karaim, Urum
- Minority: 12 recognised: Belarusian; Bulgarian; Crimean; Gagauz; German; Greek; Hungarian; Polish; Romanian; Russian; Slovak; Yiddish; 9 recognised as endangered: Belarusian; Crimean; Gagauz; Karaim; Krymchak; Romani; Ruméika; Urum; Yiddish; other: Armenian; Turkish; Albanian; Swedish
- Foreign: English, German, French, Spanish, Italian, Arabic
- Signed: Ukrainian Sign Language
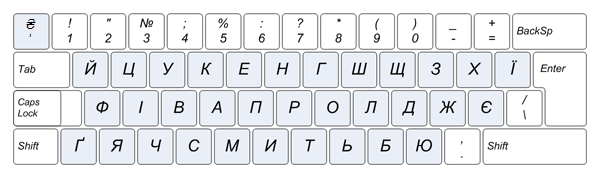
- Keyboard layout: Ukrainian keyboard
- Source: Census-2001

The official language of Ukraine is Ukrainian, an East Slavic language of the Indo-European languages family. It is spoken regularly by 88% of Ukraine's population at home in their personal life, and 87% at work or study. It is followed by Russian which is spoken by 34% in their personal life.

== Language and daily life ==
As of 2022, 81% of the population of Ukraine speak the Ukrainian language in their personal life, at the same time 34% speak Russian, meaning that a significant portion of Ukrainian residents constituting 19% of people speak both languages regularly.

=== 2001 national census ===
According to the first (and so far only) population census of 2001, ethnic Ukrainians make up 77.8% of the population. Other ethnic groups are Russians (17.3%), Belarusians (0.6%), Romanians (including Moldovans) (0.8%), Crimean Tatars (0.5%), Bulgarians (0.4%), Hungarians (0.3%), Poles (0.3%), Jews (0.2%), Armenians (0.2%), Greeks (0.2%), Karaites (>0.1%), Krymchaks (>0.1%) and Gagauzes (0.1%).

The following table gives the native languages (but not necessarily the languages spoken at home) with their number of speakers according to the 2001 census:

Language	Speakers	Total
Ukrainian	32,577,468	67.53%
Russian	14,273,670	29.59%
Romanian (including defunct Moldovan)	327,703	0.67%
Crimean Tatar	231,382	0.48%
Hungarian	161,618	0.34%
Bulgarian	134,396	0.28%
Belarusian	56,249	0.12%
Armenian	51,847	0.11%
Gagauz	23,765	0.05%
Romani	22,603	0.05%
Polish	19,195	0.04%
German	4,206	0.01%
Greek (including Mariupol Greek and Urum)	6,029	0.01%
Hebrew	3,307	0.01%
Slovak	2,768	0.01%
Karaim	96	0.00%
Other	143,163	0.30%
Not indicated	201,437	0.42%
Total	48,240,902	100%

Not included in the table above are Rusyn with 6,725 speakers as of 2001, Ukrainian Sign Language (54,000 in 2008), Eastern Yiddish (11,500 in 2007), Urum (95,000 in 2000, often included under Tatar), and Krymchak (200 as of 2007). The varieties of Romani represented are Vlax, Carpathian and Balkan. There are also speakers of the Gammalsvenska dialect of Swedish (fewer than 20).

=== Regional languages ===
Ethnologue lists 40 minority languages and dialects in Ukraine; nearly all are native to the former Soviet Union.

In August 2012, the Verkhovna Rada adopted "On the Principles of State Language Policy", which allowed a language to be elevated to the status of a "regional language" if it is spoken by at least 10% of an oblast's population. Whilst Ukrainian remained the country's only 'official' language nationwide, other languages, dependent on their adoption by oblast authorities, became accepted mediums of communication in education, local government offices, courts and official correspondence.

In February 2014, the Verkhovna Rada abolished the law on regional languages. In spite of this, then Acting President Oleksandr Turchynov refused to sign this decision. In October 2014 the Constitutional Court of Ukraine started reviewing the constitutionality of the law, and on 28 February 2018 it ruled the law unconstitutional. According to the Council of Europe, this act fails to achieve fair protection of the linguistic rights of minorities.

On 7 June 2024, the Cabinet of Ministers of Ukraine approved the list of minority languages recognised as endangered.

=== Foreign languages ===
A survey conducted in July 2023 found that almost 44% of respondents said they did not know English at all. At the same time, 26.9% of respondents said they could understand some words and simple phrases, but could not read, write or speak English at all. 19.2% of Ukrainians said they could read, write or speak some English, but not well. Among those surveyed, 7.5% can read, write and speak English, but not fluently. In contrast, only 1.1% of respondents are fluent in English.

=== Surveys using alternative methodology ===
According to research data from the Kyiv National Linguistic University, currently not displayed on its website but preserved, in particular, on ‘accessed.on.Academia.edu’, as of 2009, a somewhat different picture was observed in the use of Ukrainian and Russian languages in everyday communication by Ukrainian citizens.

Also, earlier in 2008, according to Gallup Institute research, it was found that 83% of Ukrainian citizens chose to fill out (and did fill out) a questionnaire in Russian. The methodology was that the survey was not related to the topic of language, but the questionnaires themselves were in three versions: in Russian, Ukrainian, and English. Thus, a result was achieved that was not related to the national or ideological identification of the respondents, with the results presented in the table above.

== Historical facts ==
According to the Russian Imperial Census of 1897 on the territory of the nine Russian Governorates in modern Ukraine yielded the following results:

1. Ukrainian (73.0%)
2. Russian (11.0%)
3. Yiddish (9.00%)
4. German (2.00%)
5. Polish (2.00%)
6. Belarusian (1.00%)
7. Romanian (1.00%)
8. Other (1.00%)

=== Early 21st century ===
In an October 2009 poll by a Russian political sociology company FOM-Ukraine of 1,000 respondents, 52% stated they use Russian as their "Language of communication"; while 41% of the respondents state they use Ukrainian and 8% stated they use a mixture of both.

A March 2010 poll by Research & Branding Group showed that 65% considered Ukrainian as their native language and 33% Russian. This poll also showed the standard of knowledge of the Russian language (free conversational language, writing and reading) in current Ukraine is higher (76%) than the standard of knowledge of the Ukrainian language (69%). More respondents preferred to speak Ukrainian (46%) than Russian (38%) with 16% preferring to speak both in equal manner.

A poll held November 2009 revealed that 54.7% of the population of Ukraine believed the language issue in Ukraine was irrelevant, that each person could speak the language they preferred and that a lot more important problems existed in the country; 14.7% of those polled stated that the language issue was an urgent problem that could not be postponed and that calls for immediate resolution; another 28.3% believed that, while the language issue needed to be resolved, this could be postponed.

An August 2011 poll by Razumkov Centre showed that 53.3% of the respondents use the Ukrainian language in everyday life, while 44.5% use Russian.

In a May 2012 poll by RATING, 50% of respondents considered Ukrainian their native language, 29% Russian, 20% consider both Ukrainian and Russian their mother tongue and 1% considered a different language their native language.

In an 11–23 December 2015 study by the Razumkov Centre taken in all regions of Ukraine other than Russian-annexed Crimea, and separatist controlled Donetsk, and Luhansk, a majority considered Ukrainian their native language (60%), followed by Russian (15%), while 22% used both languages equally. Two percent had another native language. For the preferred language of work, an equal amount chose either Ukrainian or Russian (37%) and 21% communicated bilingually. The study polled 10,071 individuals and held a 1% margin of error.

According to the survey carried out by RATING on 16–20 August 2023, almost 60% of the polled usually speak Ukrainian at home, about 30% – Ukrainian and Russian, only 9% – Russian. Since March 2022, the use of Russian in everyday life has been noticeably decreasing. For 82 per cent of respondents, Ukrainian is their mother tongue, and for 16 per cent, Russian is their mother tongue. IDPs and refugees living abroad are more likely to use both languages for communication or speak Russian. Nevertheless, more than 70 per cent of IDPs and refugees consider Ukrainian to be their native language.

== Maps ==
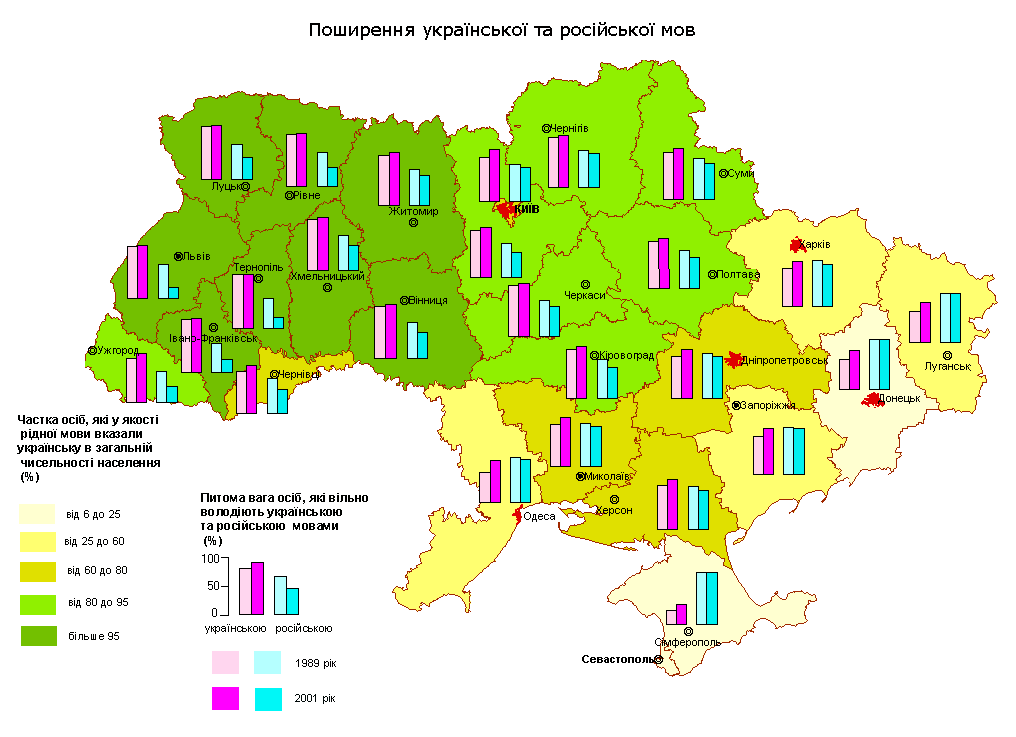
1989 / 2001 Fluency in Ukrainian (red column) and Russian (blue column)

2001 Ukrainian

2001 Russian

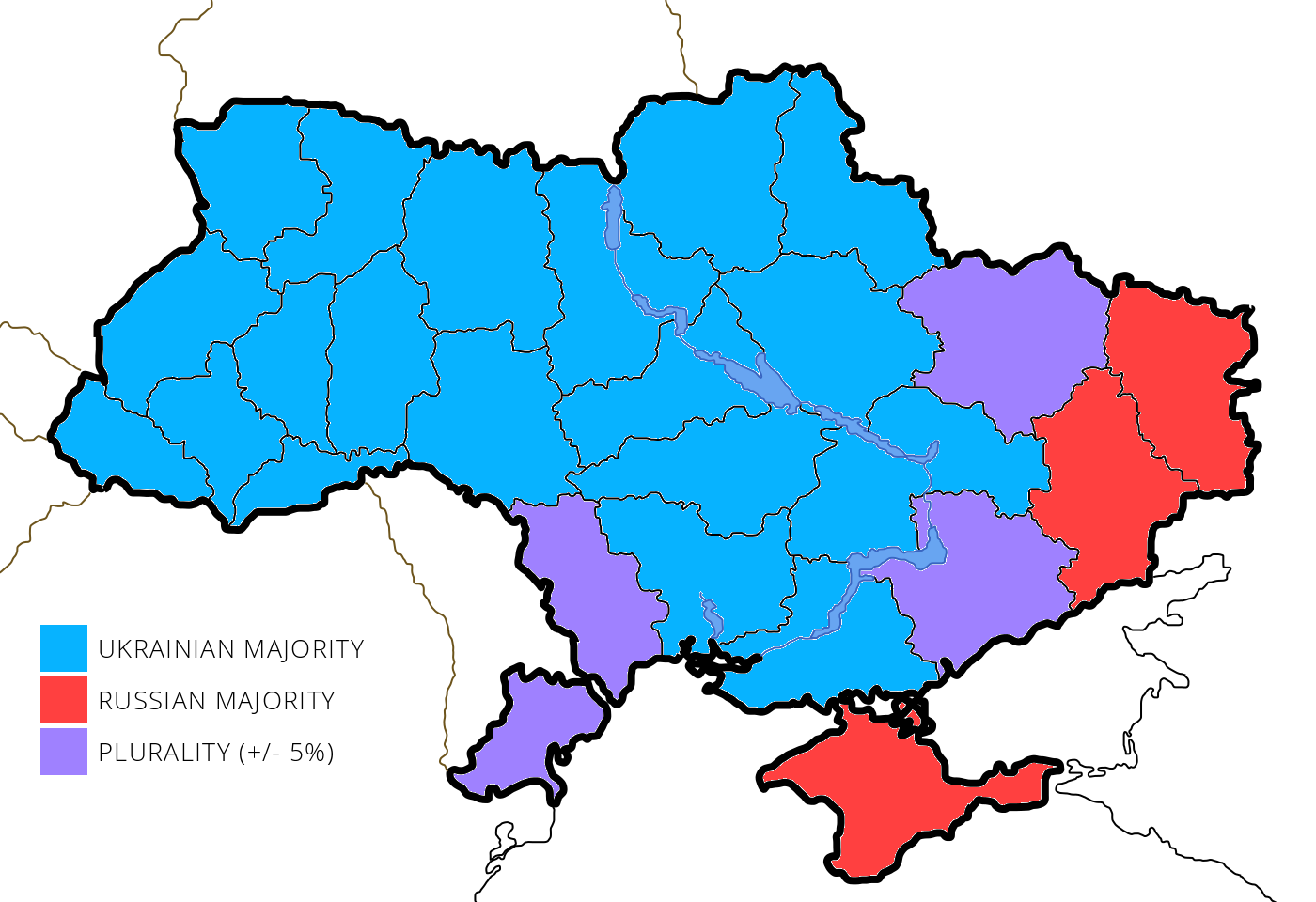
2001 Both

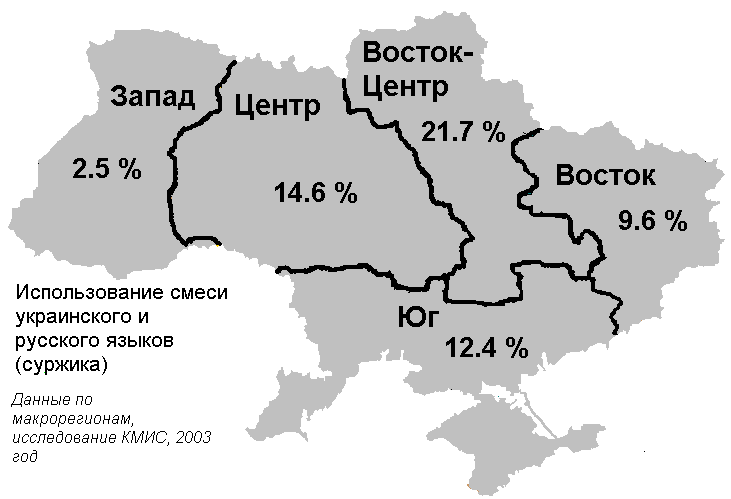
2003 Surzhyk

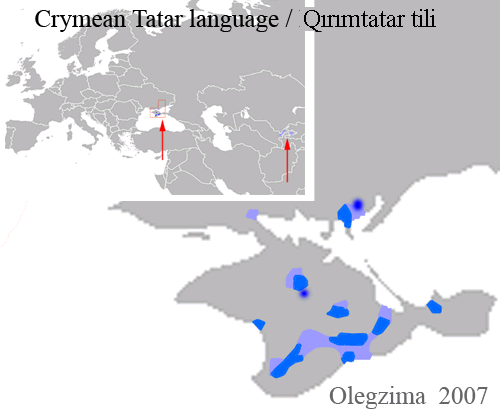
Crimean Tatar language in Crimea

== Language policy ==
In November 2016, a new rule came into force requiring Ukraine's radio stations to play a quota of Ukrainian-language songs each day. The law also requires TV and radio broadcasters to ensure 60% of programs such as news and analysis are in Ukrainian.

In September 2017, Ukraine instituted a similar policy on languages in public education. The law required that schools use Ukrainian, the national language, in all classes that did not require a second language. The exception from this is language classes that would be taught using "English or other official languages of the European Union." The new spelling version was adopted by the Cabinet of Ministers of Ukraine in May 2019.

== See also ==
- Minorities in Ukraine
- Russian language in Ukraine
- Russification of Ukraine
- Derussification in Ukraine
- Chronology of Ukrainian language suppression
- Language ombudsman (Ukraine)
