= Runska =

Swedish variety from Ruhnu Island

Ruhnu Estonian Swedish
- Runska
- runömålet
- Genesis 1:1-3 in Ruhnu Estonian Swedish displayed in Ruhnu's New Church, 2026
- Region: Ruhnu (historically), Sweden (post-1944 evacuation from Ruhnu)
- Language family: Indo-European: Germanic; North Germanic; East Scandinavian; Swedish; East Swedish; Estonian Swedish; Ruhnu Estonian Swedish

Language codes
- ISO 639-3: –
- Glottolog: None

Ruhnu Estonian Swedish or Runska (Standard Swedish: runömålet) is the Swedish variety, which was spoken on Ruhnu Island (Swedish: Runö) in the Gulf of Rīga until 1944 when almost all of the island’s population fled to Sweden. Runska is a variety of Estonian Swedish and belongs to the Eastern Swedish dialects.

Runska represents a particularly unique variety of Estonian Swedish due to both its geographic isolation and its unique contact environment in the Gulf of Rīga, which exposed it to influence from several languages (Estonian, Livonian, Latvian, Russian, German). Therefore, as compared to Standard Swedish, Runska exhibits both conservative as well as innovative linguistic features.

== History ==
The inhabitants of Ruhnu and the fact that these inhabitants were Swedish peasants is first mentioned in a document dated 28 June 1341 in which the Bishop of Courland grants the inhabitants of Ruhnu the right to live as free peasants under Swedish law. This right was continuously asserted by the people of Ruhnu even until modern times.

Following the establishment of independent Estonia and Latvia, both countries claimed Ruhnu. The Ruhnu islanders agreed that Ruhnu would become part of Estonia on 4 June 1919; however, in 1921, the Ruhnu islanders petitioned Sweden to annex the island, as they were dissatisfied with their young men being forced to leave Ruhnu for their conscription as well as high state taxes and not being permitted to harvest trees from state forests for their own use. As a result, the Estonian government agreed to allow Ruhnu islanders to cut down trees on the island for their own use without paying a fee and to permit island residents to serve their conscription period on the island. This also helped keep the Runska speech community more intact during the 1920s and 1930s.

Swedish place names appearing on directional signage on Ruhnu, 2026

Following the evacuation of the Ruhnu islanders to Sweden in 1943 and 1944, Runska speakers were gradually assimilated linguistically into Standard Swedish speakers. However, there exists interest in Ruhnu Swedish identity among Ruhnu Swedish descendants as well as present-day residents of Ruhnu. Runöbornas förening (Runö Islanders’ Association) was founded in Sweden as a community organization for Ruhnu Swedes and their descendants, while the Ruhnu Kultuuriruum (Ruhnu Cultural Space) has been active on Ruhnu in sharing information on and promoting projects relating to Ruhnu’s historical Swedish identity. Between 2024 and 2026, Nordplus funded a project under the Nordic Languages Programme led by the University of Tartu to document existing archive materials in Runska and to create teaching materials for use in the Ruhnu Island school for incorporating elements of Ruhnu Swedish into Swedish classes.

== Phonology ==
The phonology of Runska includes conservative traits typical of other Estonian Swedish dialects in the Baltic Sea area, such as the preservation of Old Norse diphthongs, e.g., bäin ‘leg’, dråom ‘dream’, cf. Standard Swedish ben and dröm.

Like other varieties of Estonian Swedish, and unlike Standard Swedish, Runska lacks the contrast between Accent 1 (acute accent; Swedish akut) and Accent 2 (grave accent; Swedish grav).

A feature of Runska which also characterizes other Estonian Swedish dialects is apocope, resulting in the loss of unstressed vowels after long syllables, e.g., rop ‘shout’, kist ‘coffin’, cf. Standard Swedish ropa, kista.

Runska, like other Estonian Swedish dialects, did not experience the sound changes that took place during the Modern Swedish period. Therefore, the consonant clusters tj and sj have not undergone assimilation into fricatives, and the velar stops /g/ and /k/ have not undergone softening into /j/ and /ɕ/ before front vowels, e.g., giva ‘to give’, kira ‘to drive’, stjarn ‘star’, cf. Standard Swedish /je:/, /ˈɕœːra/, /ˈɧæːɳa/.

As in other Estonian Swedish dialects, the Runska consonant inventory includes a voiceless lateral fricative [ɬ], which developed from the cluster /sl/ and appears in, e.g., hlip ‘sharpen’, lihlan ‘little’, cf. Standard Swedish slipa.

A characteristic phonological feature that distinguishes Runska from all other Estonian Swedish dialects is the preservation of the Old Swedish velar fricative g, [ɣ], in words such as soagh ‘saw’ and loaghan ‘low’ (<gh> is commonly used for the fricative g in dialect transcriptions), cf. Standard Swedish såg, låg .

== Morphology ==
Runska stands out by having lost the morphological distinction between definite and indefinite forms of plural nouns. Hence, for instance, piko can mean both ‘girls’ and ‘the girls’.

Runska has a richer morphology than Standard Swedish and has retained several grammatical features of Old Swedish, including the three-gender system. Words are assigned masculine, feminine, or neuter gender and described using equivalents of the pronouns ‘he’, ‘she’, and ‘it’:

han mann ‘the man’ (masculine)

hoan märra ‘the mare’ (feminine)

he träie ‘the tree’ (neuter)

The three-gender system is also reflected in the morphology of articles, adjectives, pronouns, and numerals, which are usually inflected for number and gender. In the following examples, the article (en) and adjective (prähte) agree with the nouns.

en prähtjan bruggosman ‘a beautiful groom’ (singular masculine)

ein prähtjo bru ‘a beautiful bride’ (singular feminine)

ett prähtet bord ‘a beautiful table’ (singular neuter)

== Syntax ==
Double negation is often used in Runska. The negations are bolded in the following sentence, which literally translates as: “Not had we no pub on Runö, and not had we no movie theater.”

Äte hav vi engan kro på Run, å äte hav vi engt kino.

‘We did not have any pub on Runö, and we did not have any movie theater.’

== Vocabulary ==
Runska is distinguished by the presence of many words not found in other Estonian Swedish areas, e.g., glam ‘talk’, pilt ‘boy’, as well as its German-like numeral system, e.g., fjur o tiou ‘twenty-four', fem o treti ‘thirty-five’, cf. Standard Swedish tjugofyra, trettiofem.

The vocabulary of Runska has preserved many words or word forms that are no longer in use in Standard Swedish, e.g., kuna ‘woman’ and dur ‘big’ (from diger). The word ölmpt 'swan' is particularly interesting as it is not attested in Swedish, and is only preserved in a few place names in Sweden such as Ältasjön (lit. ‘the swan lake’) in Nacka municipality. Likewise, the word mjul ‘ball’, which is found in Old Icelandic as mýll, does not occur in Standard Swedish.

Runska speakers had significant contact with neighboring communities speaking other languages and Runska vocabulary shows influence from this contact, especially with Estonian and German, but most likely also with Russian, Livonian, and Latvian. Quite a few common words were borrowed from Estonian.

== See also ==
- Estonian Swedes
- Estonian Swedish
