= Estonian Swedes =

Swedish-speaking minority of Estonia

Regions with significant populations
- Sweden: c. 7000 (1945)
- Estonia: 811 (2021)

Languages
- Estonian Swedish, Estonian

Religion
- Historically Lutheranism; Predominantly irreligious

Related ethnic groups
- Finland-Swedes, Swedes, Baltic Germans

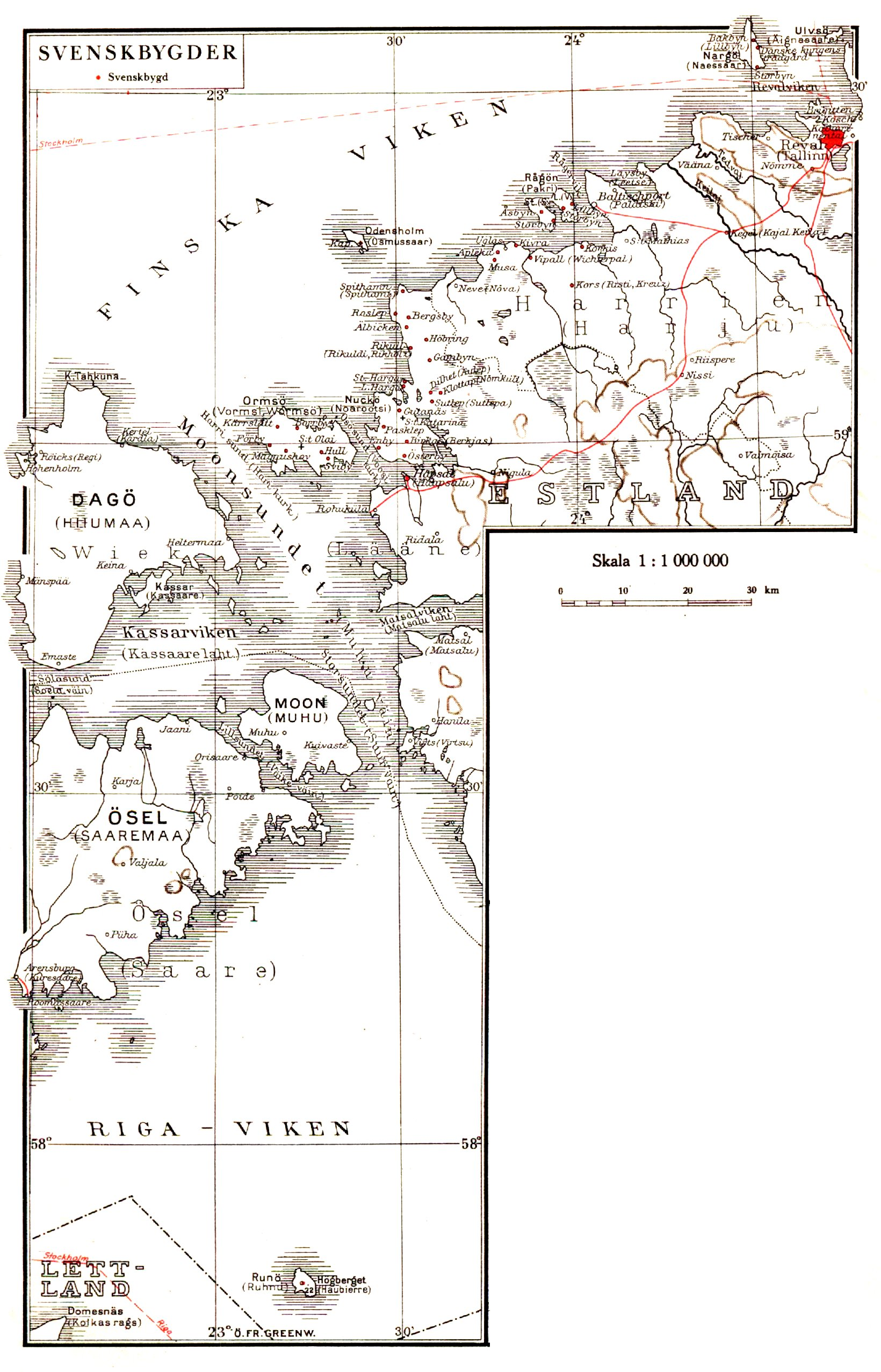
Swedish towns and villages in Western Estonia

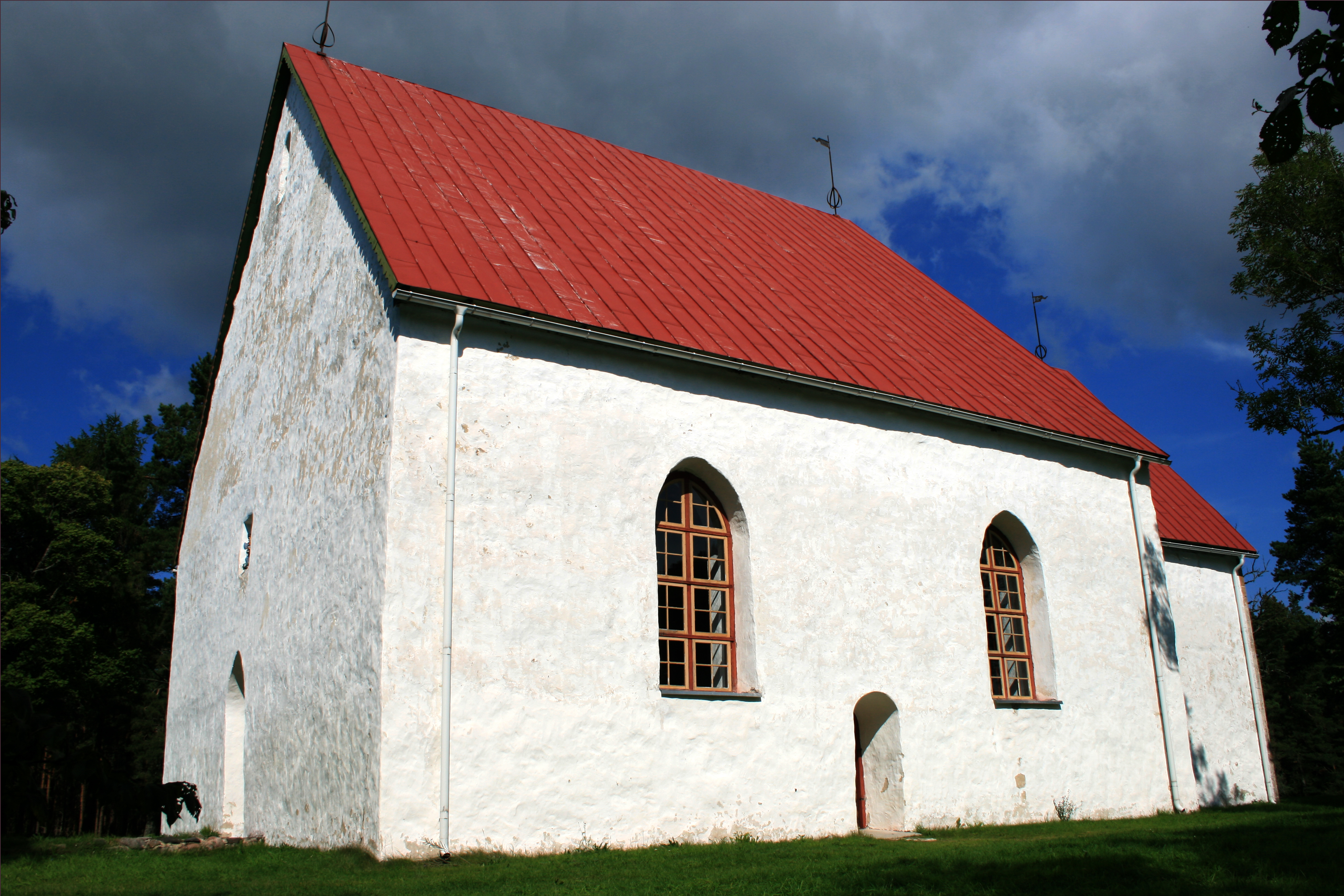
Swedish church in Hullo, Vormsi

The Estonian Swedes (Swedish: estlandssvenskar, or aibofolke, "island people"; Estonian: eestirootslased, or rannarootslased, "coastal Swedes") are a Swedish-speaking minority traditionally residing in the coastal areas and islands of what is now western and northern Estonia. During World War II, almost all of the remaining Swedish-speaking minority escaped from the Soviet invasion of Estonia and fled to Sweden in 1944. Only the descendants of a few individuals who stayed behind are permanent residents in Estonia today.

== History ==
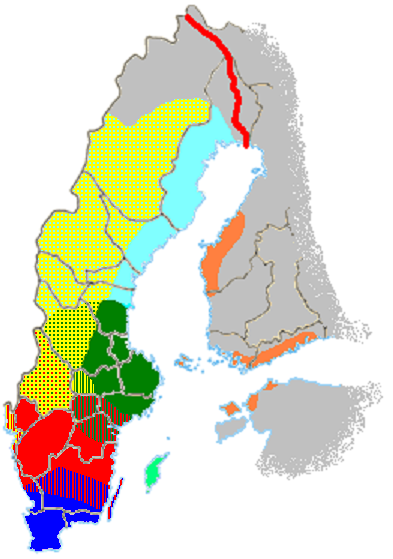
Traditional Swedish Sprachraum, with dialects marked

=== Early history ===
The Swedish-speaking population in Estonia persisted for about 650 years. The first written mention of the Swedish population in Estonia comes from 1294, in the laws of the town of Haapsalu. Further early mentions of Swedes in Estonia came in 1341 and 1345 (when an Estonian monastery in Padise sold "the Laoküla Estate" and Suur-Pakri Island to a group of Swedes). Based on some of the place names, it is possible that there was a Swedish presence in Estonia even earlier. From the 13th century and through to the 15th century, large numbers of Swedes arrived in coastal Estonia from Swedish-speaking parts of Finland, which was part of the Kingdom of Sweden (and would remain so until 1809), often settling on Church-owned land. The first documented record of the island of Ruhnu (Swedish: Runö), and of its Swedish population, is also a 1341 letter sent by the Bishop of Courland which confirmed the islanders' right to reside and manage their property in accordance with Swedish law.

=== Swedish Estonia ===
The Swedish Empire in 1658, including the Dominion of Swedish Estonia and the Dominion of Swedish Livonia (now southern Estonia)

In 1561, Sweden established the Dominion of Swedish Estonia, which it would hold until 1710 (formally until 1721, when the territory was ceded to Russia under the Treaty of Nystad). The Estonia-Swedes prospered during this period. Swedish, along with German and Estonian, was one of the official languages.

=== Russian rule ===
After the Teutonic Order lost much of its power in the 16th century and the Dominion of Swedish Estonia was lost to Russia following the Great Northern War (1700–1721), conditions worsened for Swedes in Estonia: the lands they had settled were often confiscated from the Church and given to local nobility, and taxes increased. This situation remained the same during Russian rule, and the Estonian Swedes' suffering continued as, for example, the agrarian reforms which liberated the land of Estonian serfs in 1816, did not apply to (mostly non-serf) Estonian Swedes.

==== Forced emigrations ====
At certain times during Russian Estonia period, groups of Estonian Swedes were forced to leave Estonia for other parts of the Russian Empire. Most notably, Empress Catherine II of Russia forced the 1,000 Swedes of Hiiumaa (Swedish: Dagö), to move to Southern Russia (today littoral Ukraine) in 1781, where they established the community of Gammalsvenskby (today within Kherson Oblast).

=== Conditions improve ===
The Estonian Swedes' positions improved during the 1850s and 1860s, due to further agrarian reforms, but discrimination remained during the rest of the period of Tsarist rule in Estonia. After the First World War and the Russian Revolution, the independent Republic of Estonia was created in 1918. The constitution of independent Estonia granted the ethnic minority groups the control over their language of education, the right to form institutions for their national and social rights, the right to use their native language in official capacities where they formed majorities of the population, and the choice of nationality. Swedes, Baltic Germans, Russians, and Jews all had ministers in the new national government. Svenska Folkförbundet, a Swedish political organization, was formed. In 1925, a new law giving more cultural autonomy was passed, although the Russians and Swedes in Estonia did not take advantage of these new freedoms, mainly for economic reasons.

=== World War II ===
In 1939, the Soviet Union forced Estonia to sign a treaty concerning military bases. Many of the islands upon which Estonian Swedes lived were confiscated, bases were built on them, and their inhabitants were forced to leave their homes. A year later, Estonia was occupied by, and annexed into, the Soviet Union, and their voice in government was lost. Estonian Swedish men were conscripted into the Red Army and, during the German occupation, into the German armed forces. Most of the remaining Estonian Swedes fled to Sweden prior to the second occupation of Estonia by the Soviet Union in 1944. On 8 June 1945, there were 6,554 Estonian Swedes and 21,815 ethnic Estonian refugees in Sweden.

=== Today ===
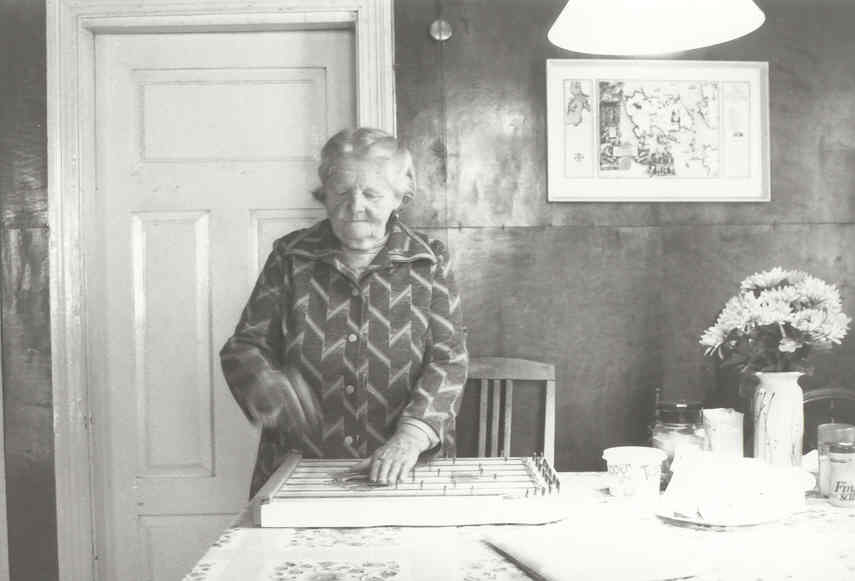
Maria Murman (1911–2004), an Estonian Swede who remained in Estonia after the Second World War, in Vormsi (Ormsö), 1994

Today, small groups of remaining Estonian Swedes are regrouping and re-establishing their heritage, by studying Swedish language and culture. They are led by the Estonian Swedish Council, which is backed by the Estonian government. In 2000, Swedes were the 21st largest ethnic group in Estonia, numbering only 300. There are however many Estonian Swedes and descendants of Estonian Swedes residing in Sweden.

== Areas of population and demographics ==
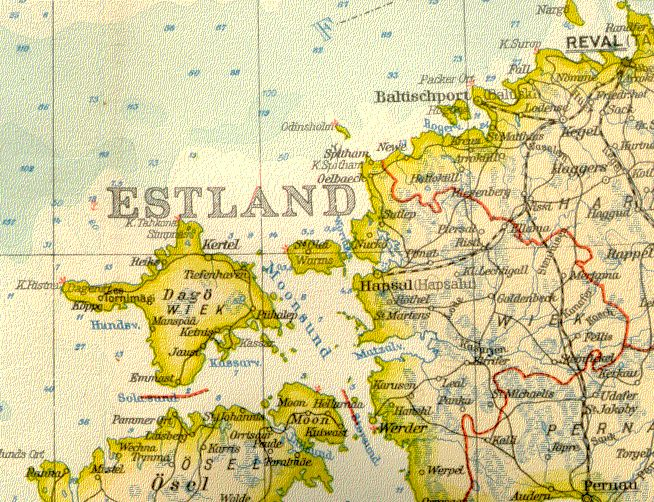
An older Swedish map of the West Estonian archipelago, in which the Estonian Swedish population was concentrated

Population figures during the early centuries of Swedish settlement are not available. At the end of the Teutonic period, there were probably around 1,000 Estonian Swedish families, with some 1,500 Swedes in the capital Tallinn (Swedish: Reval), giving a total population of roughly 5–7 thousand, some 2–3% of the population of what is now Estonia at the time.

The 1897 Russian Census gives a total Swedish population of 5,768 or 1.39% in the Governorate of Estonia. The majority of the Swedes lived in the Wiek County where they formed a minority of 5.6%.

The 1922 census gives Estonia a total population of 1,107,059 of which Estonian Swedes made up only 0.7%, some 7,850 people, who made up majorities in some places, such as Ruhnu (Swedish: Runö), Vormsi (Swedish: Ormsö), Riguldi (Swedish: Rickull). It dropped slightly to 7,641 in 1934. By the time of the Second World War, the population was nearly 10,000, and roughly 9,000 of these people fled to Sweden. Towns with large pre-war Swedish populations include Haapsalu (Swedish: Hapsal) and Tallinn (Swedish: Reval).

After World War II, the numbers stayed fairly stable: there were 435 Estonian Swedes in 1970, 254 in 1979 and 297 in 1989, when they placed 26th on the list of Estonia's minority groups (before the Second World War, they were third in number, after Russians and Germans). The 2000 census shows a number of 300, placing Swedes at 20th on the list of Estonia's minority groups. However, only 211 of them are Estonian citizens. Since all do not claim their real ethnic background, some have estimated the real number of Estonian Swedes in Estonia to be about 1,000.

== Language ==
The Estonian Swedish dialects were part of the Eastern varieties of Swedish. There was not a unified Estonian-Swedish dialect, but several. Ruhnu had its own dialect, the Vormsi-Noarootsi-Riguldi dialect was spoken on those islands, and there was also a Pakri-Vihterpalu variety. The dialect of Hiiumaa is still spoken by a few in Gammalsvenskby, Ukraine (which is called Gammölsvänskbi in the Gammalsvenska dialect).

== Notable individuals ==
- Bengt Gottfried Forselius (c. 1660–1688), a founder of public education in Estonia, author of first ABC-book in Estonian
- George Hackenschmidt (1877–1968), Estonian strongman, professional wrestler, writer and sports philosopher
- Lennart Meri (1929–2006), Estonian writer, film director and statesman.
- Ragnar Nurkse (1907–1959), Estonian-American economist; pioneer of the Balanced Growth Theory

== Gallery ==
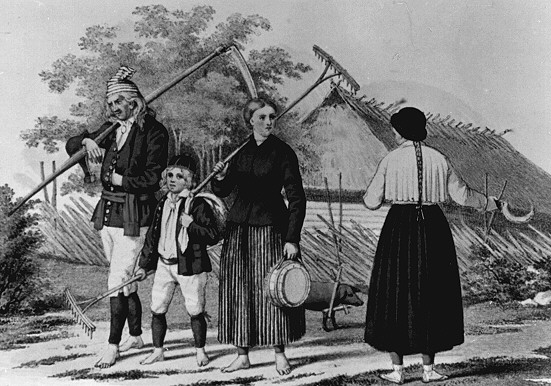
Farmers of Noarootsi (Swedish: Nuckö) peninsula in 19th-century clothing

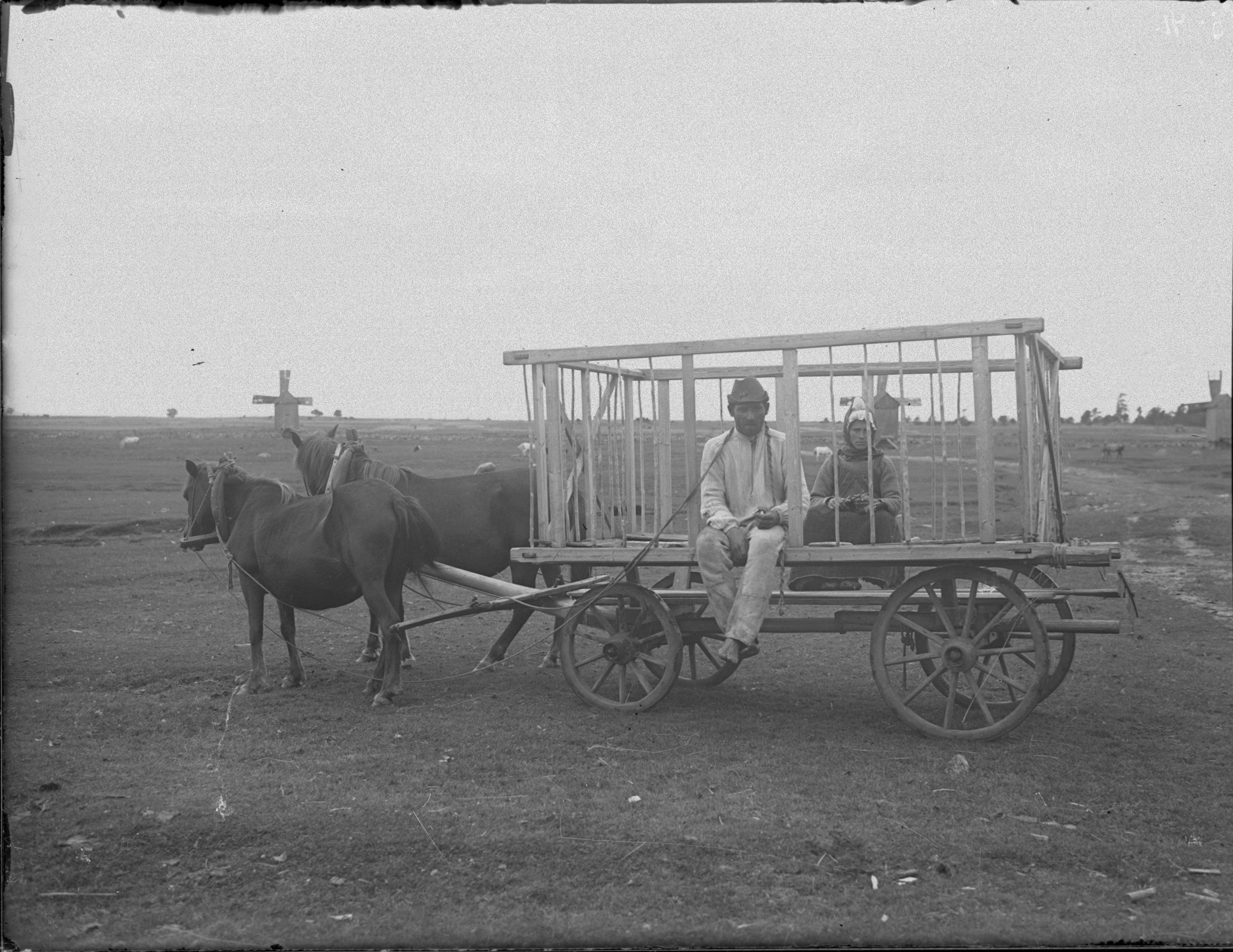
Husband and wife during rye harvest, Ruhnu (Runö) island, 1924

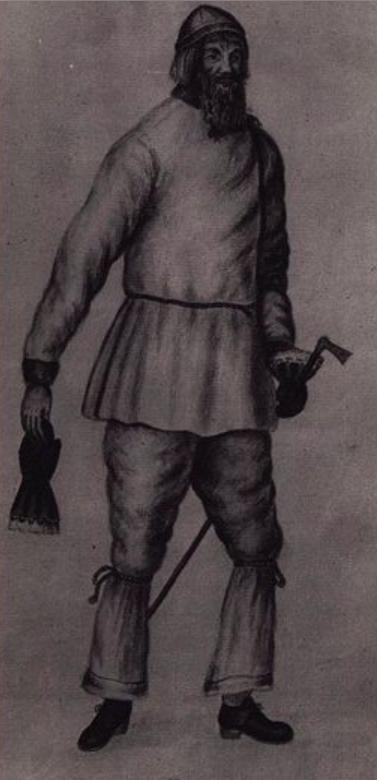
A seal hunter from Ruhnu (Runö), drawing, c. 1930

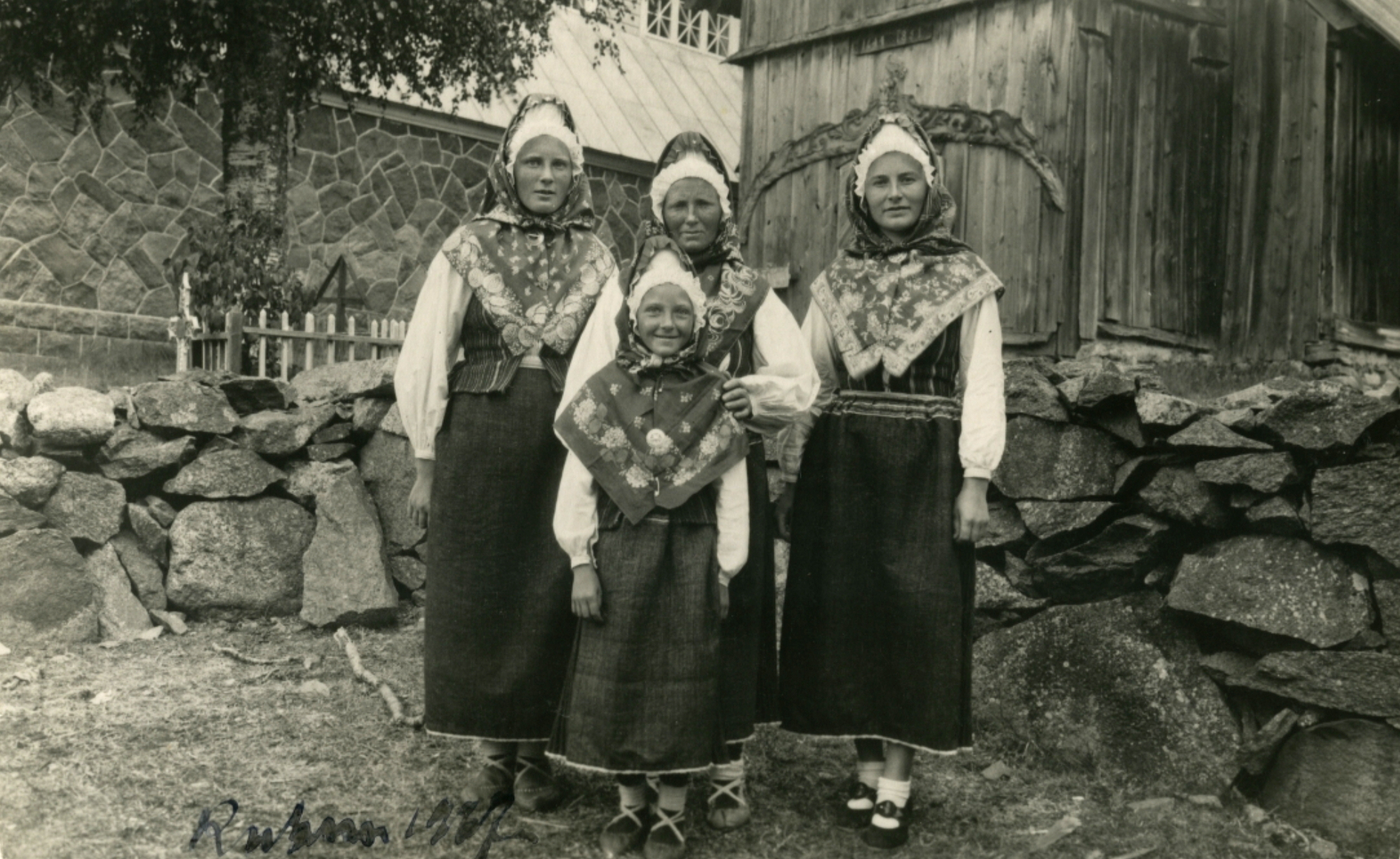
Ruhnu (Runö) women by the village church, 1937

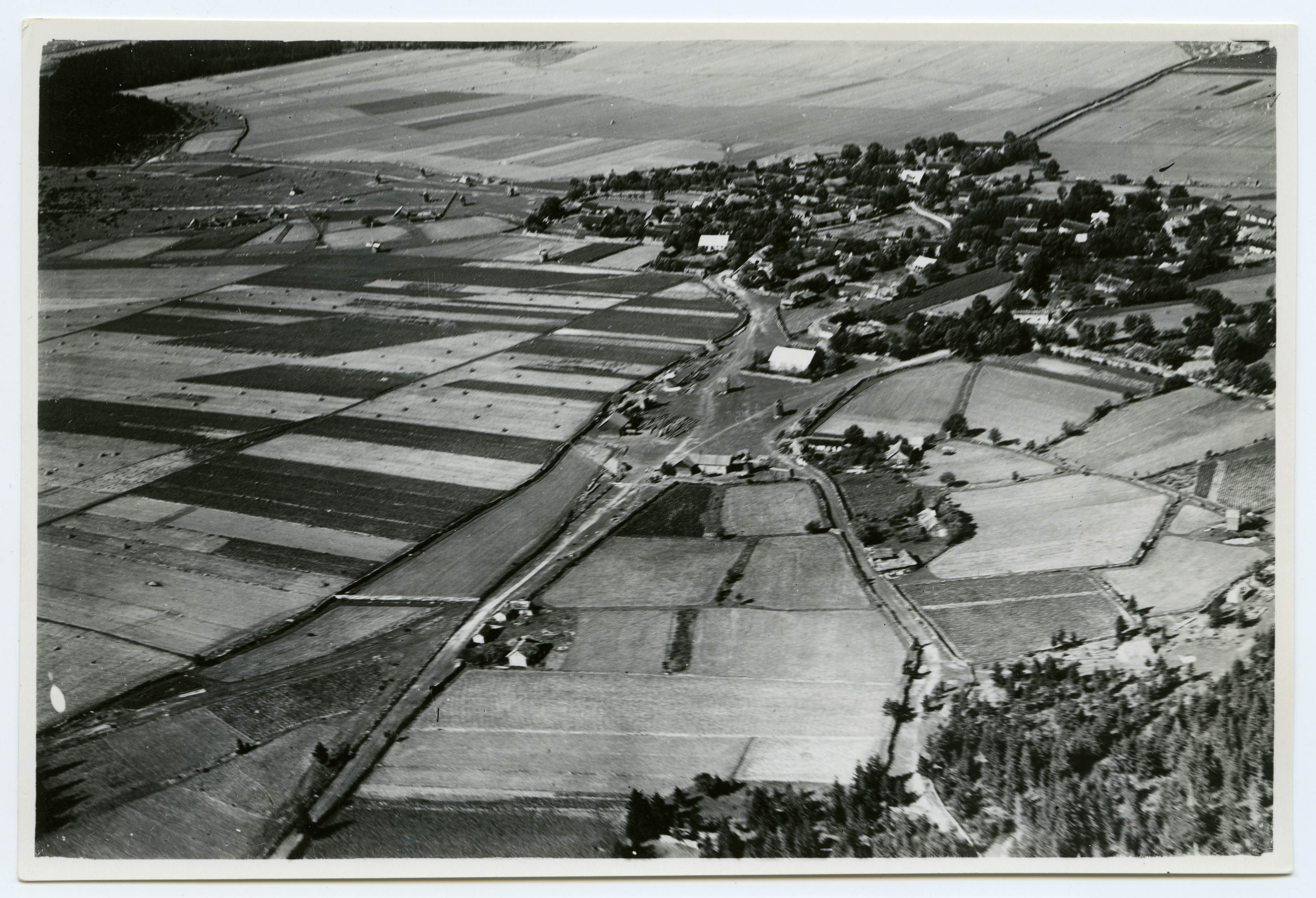
Kersleti (Kärrslett) village on Vormsi (Ormsö) island, 1934

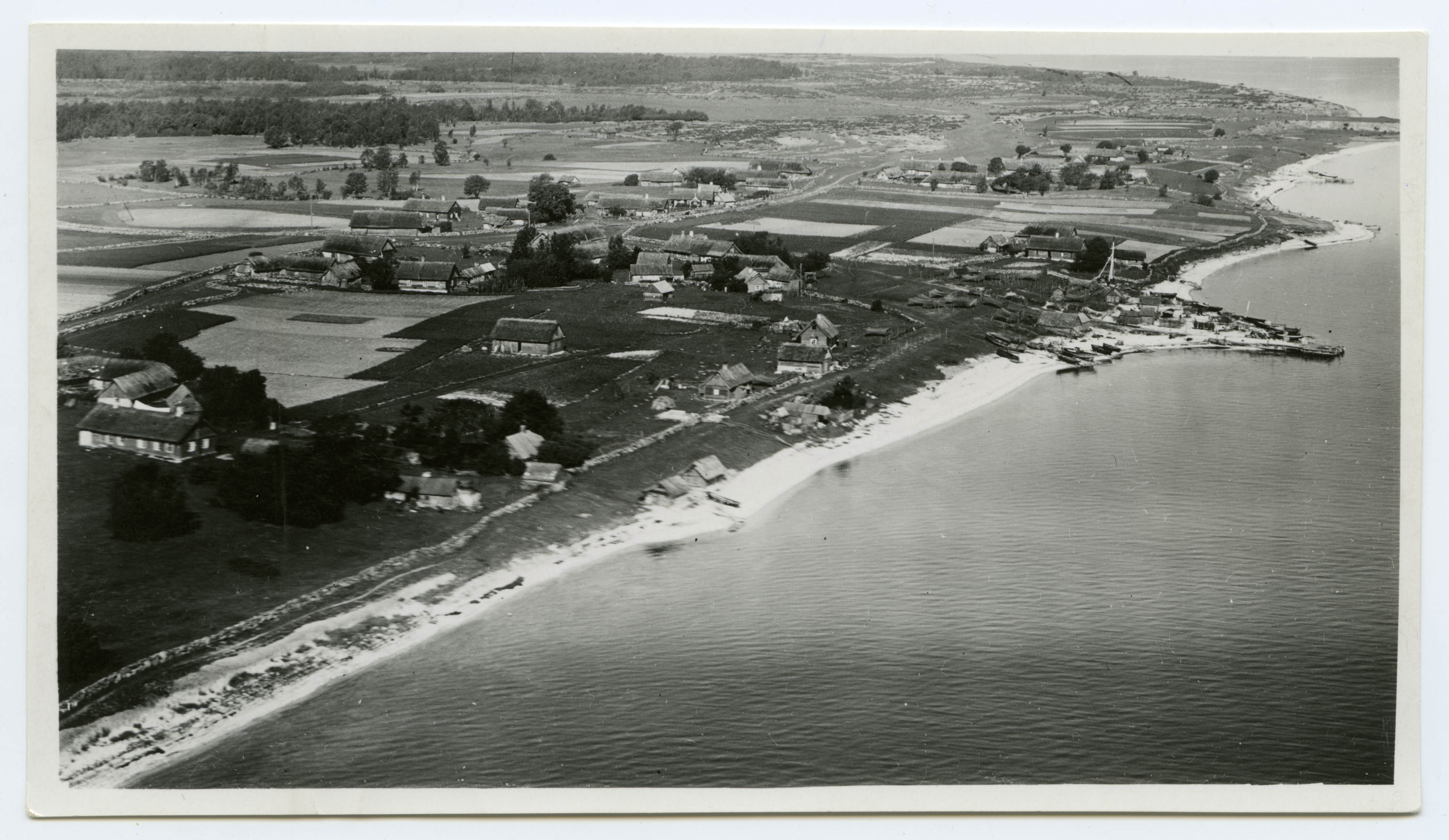
Väike (Lillbyn) village on Väike-Pakri (Lilla Rågö) island, 1934

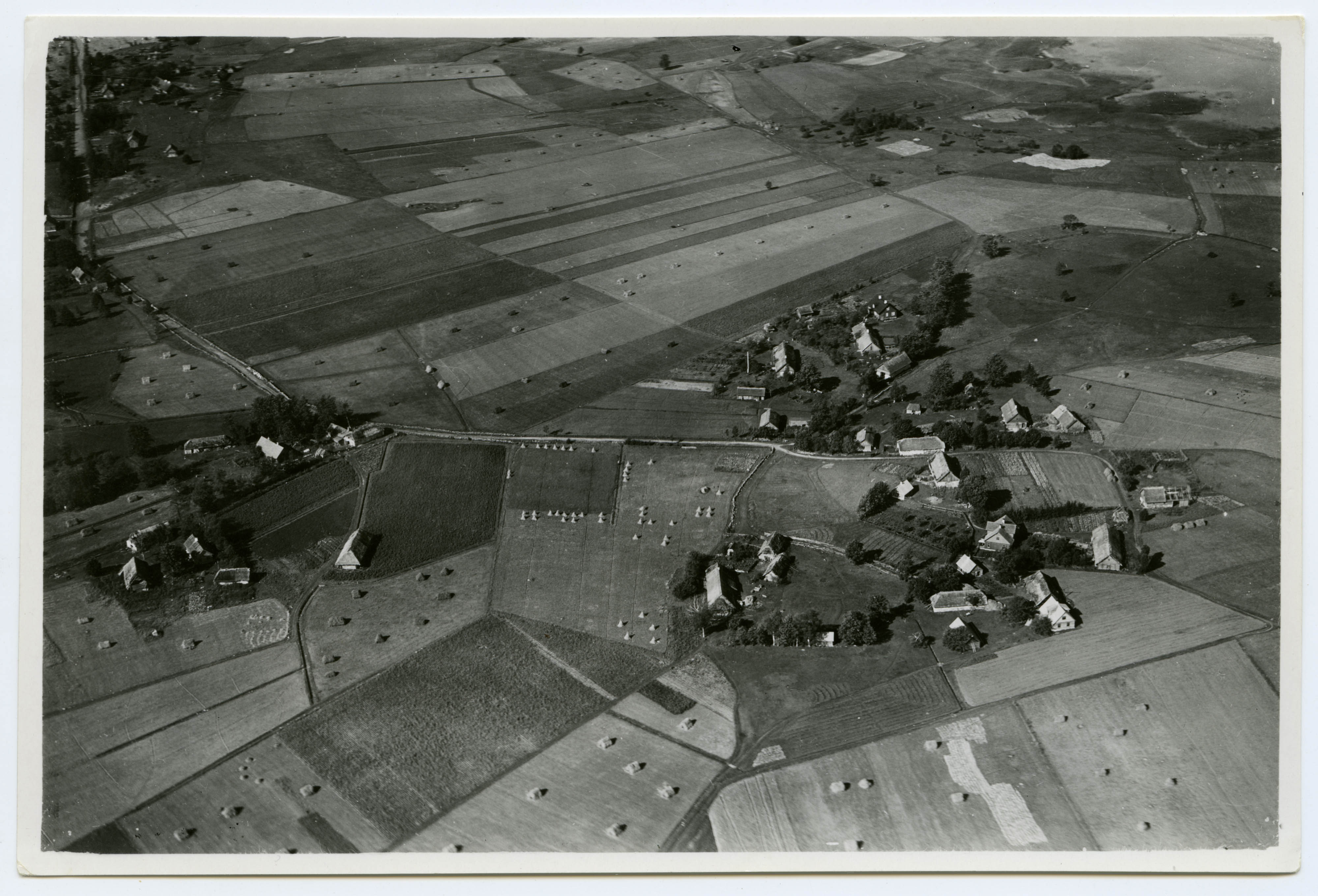
Aerial photo of Kurkse (Korkis) village on mainland, 1934

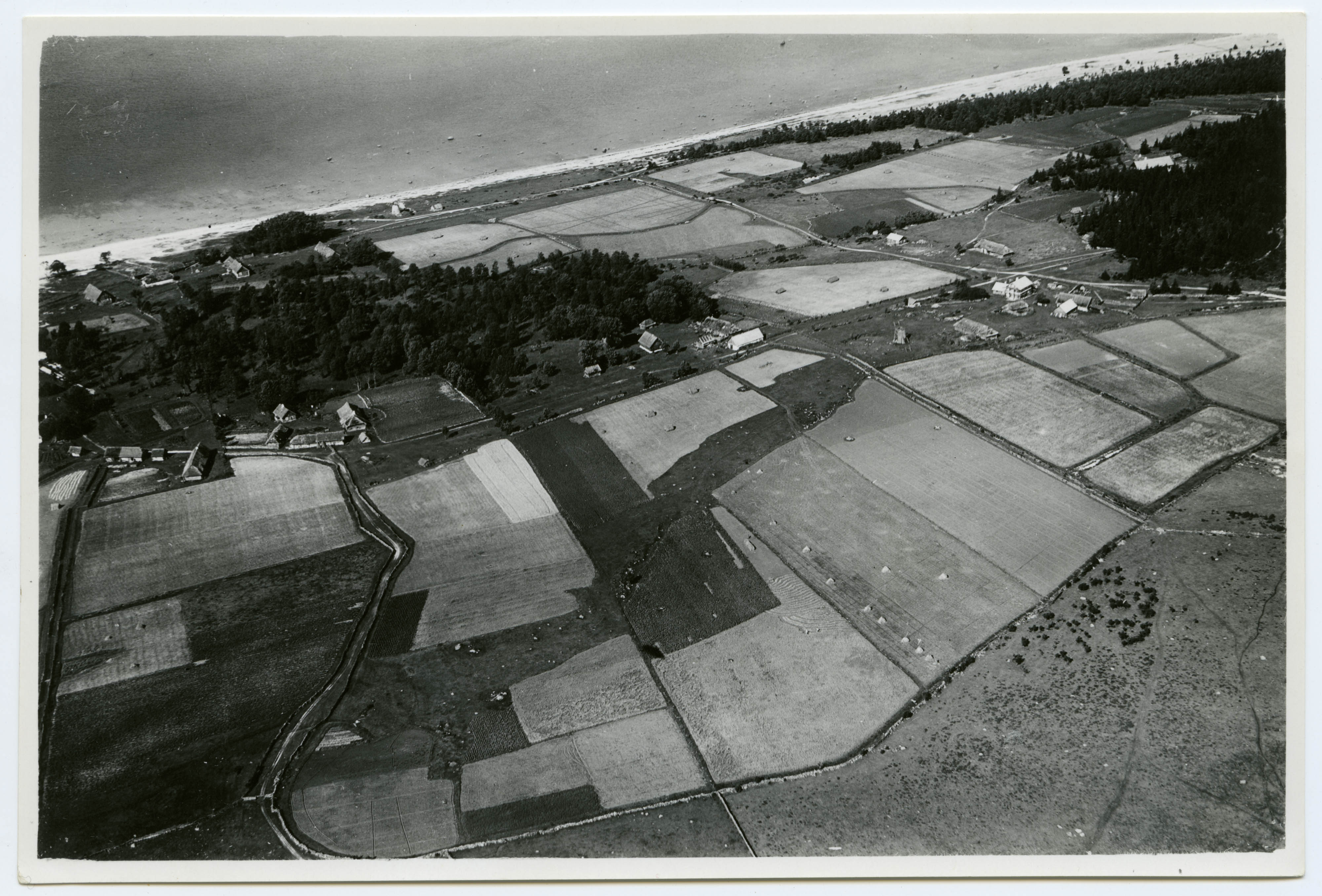
Aerial photo of Alliklepa (Aklop) village on mainland, 1934

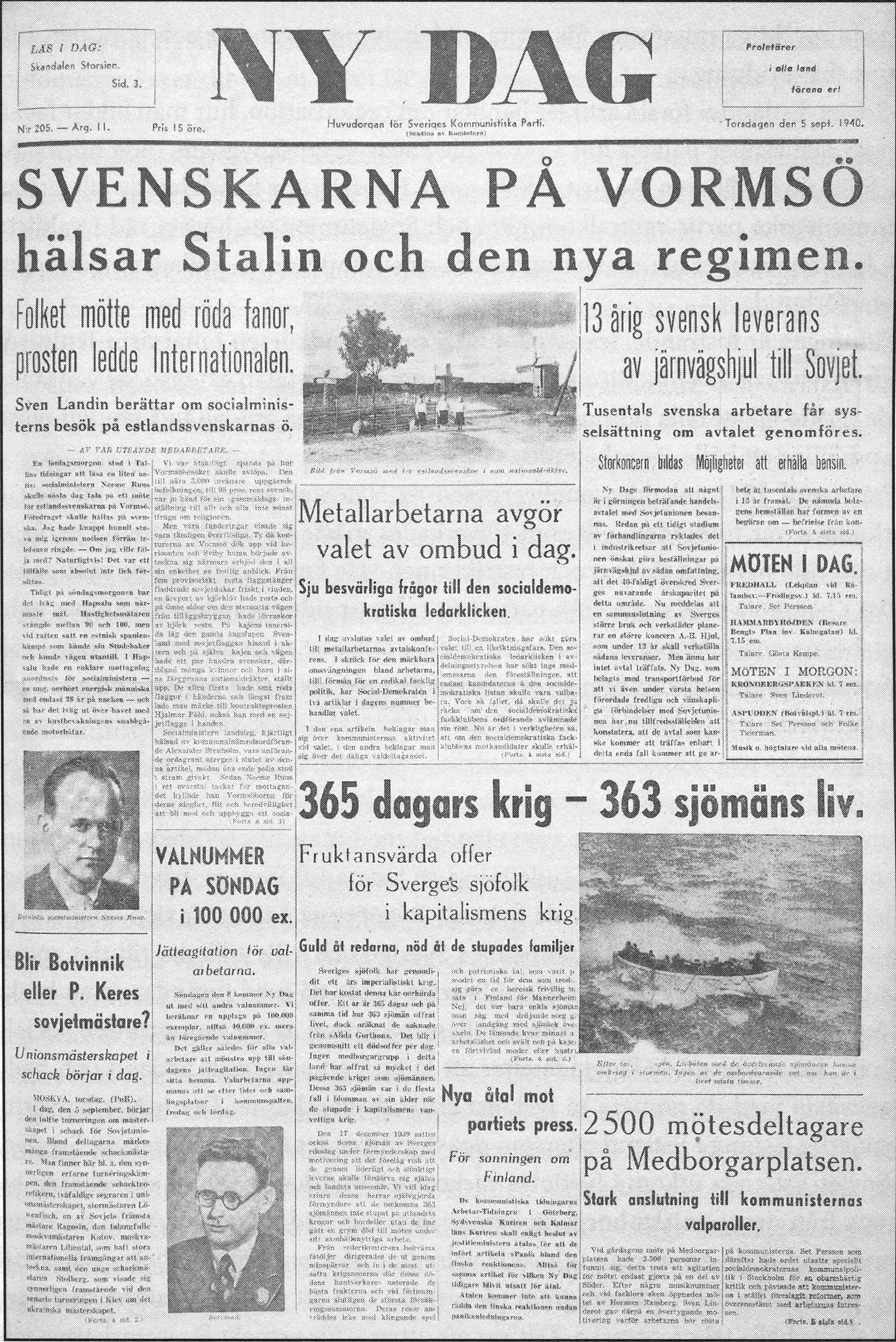
Swedish communist daily Ny Dag headline on 5 September 1940: "The Swedes on Vormsi greet Stalin and the new regime"

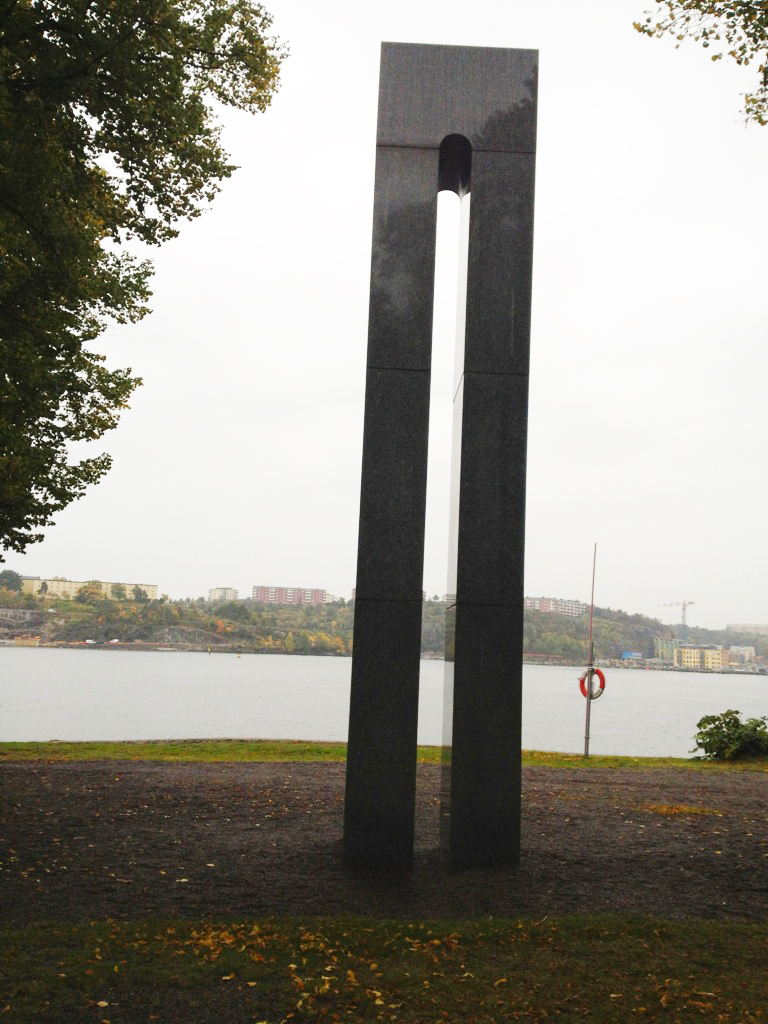
Frihetens port (The Freedom Gate) monument to Estonian Swedish World War II refugees in Djurgården, Stockholm.

== See also ==
- Estonia–Sweden relations
- Estonian National Council in Sweden
