= Gammalsvenskby =

Rural neighborhood in Kherson Oblast, Ukraine, with historic ties to Sweden

Gammalsvenskby Gammölsvänskbi Старошведське (Staroshvedske)
- Neighbourhood and former village
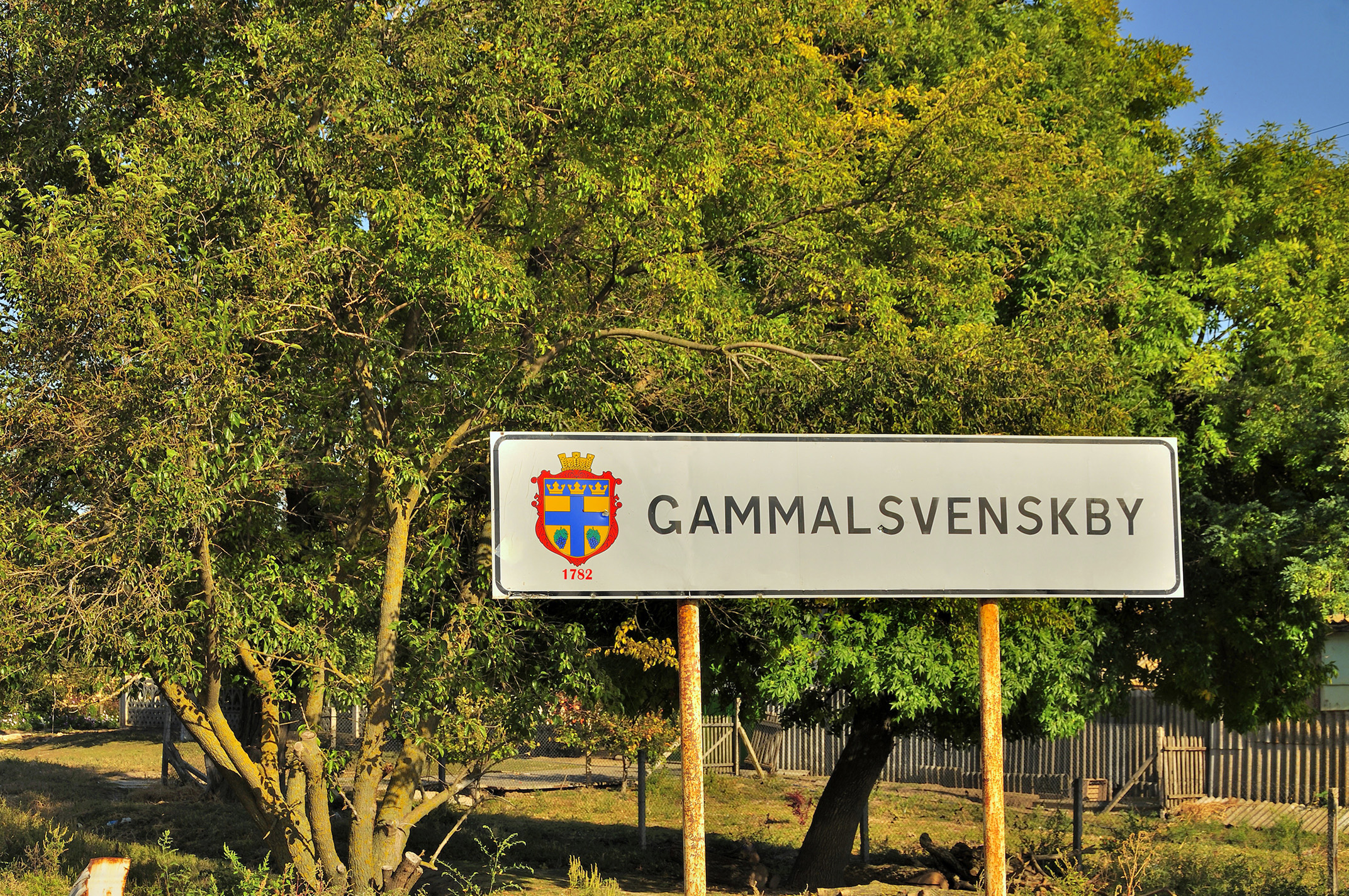
- Interactive map of Gammalsvenskby
- Location of the village Gammalsvenskby (Ukraine)
- Coordinates: 46°52′28.83″N 33°35′15.59″E
- Country: Ukraine
- Oblast: Kherson Oblast
- Raion: Beryslav Raion
- Hromada: Beryslav urban hromada
- Village: Zmiivka
- Elevation: 55 m (180 ft)
- Time zone: UTC+02:00 (EET)
  - Summer (DST): UTC+03:00 (EEST)
- Post Code: 74372

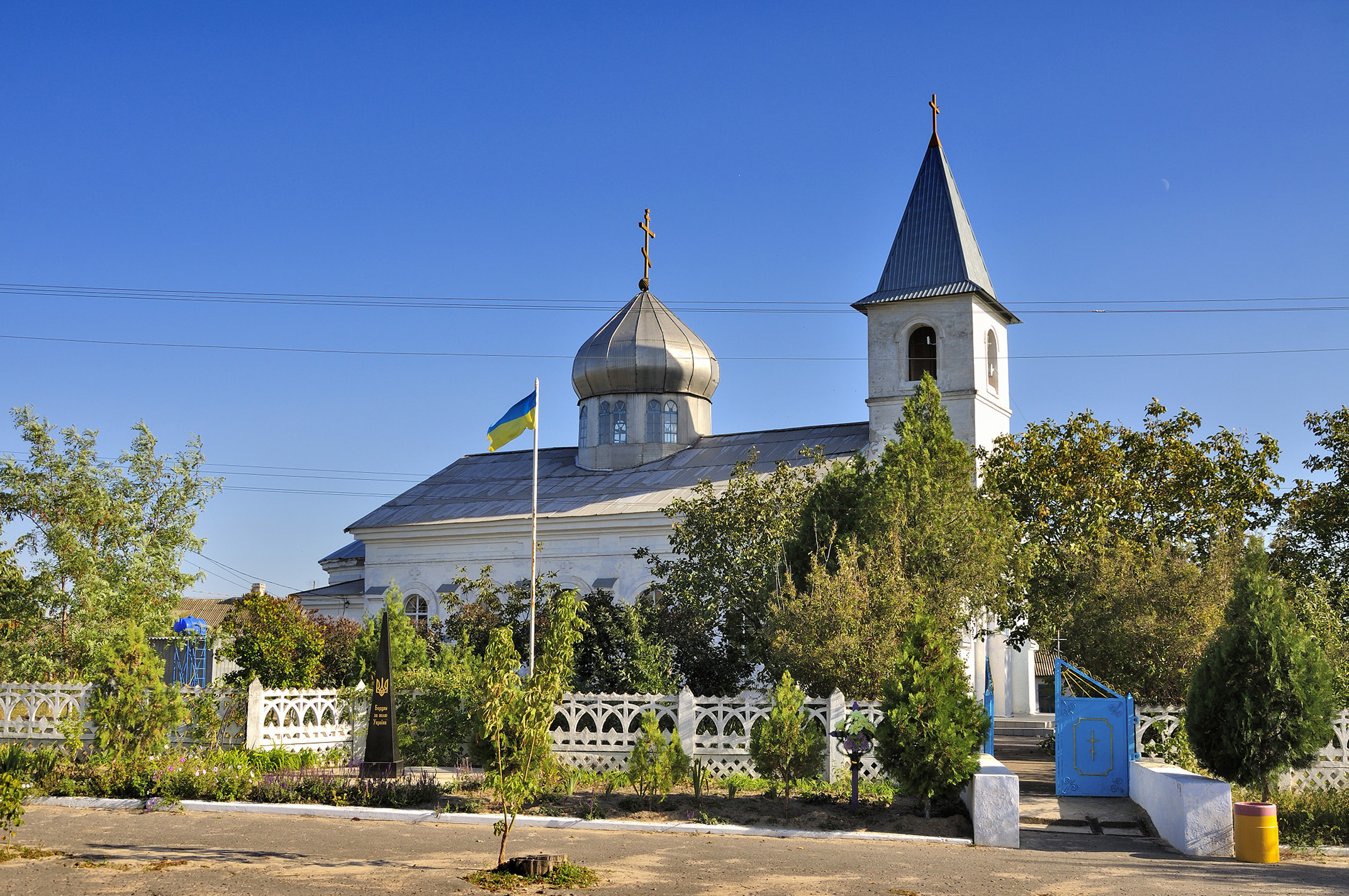
The former Swedish church in Gammalsvenskby. St John's Lutheran parish church has been rebuilt and serves as an Orthodox church today

Gammalsvenskby (Gammalsvenska: Gammölsvänskbi, lit. 'Old Swedish Village'; Ukrainian: Старошведське, romanized: Staroshvedske; German: Alt-Schwedendorf) is a former village that is now a neighbourhood of Zmiivka (Ukrainian: Зміївка) in Beryslav Raion of Kherson Oblast, Ukraine. It was briefly known as Verbivka (Ukrainian: Вербівка) prior to being integrated with Zmiivka. Gammalsvenskby is known for its Estonian Swedish cultural heritage.

Zmiivka also includes three former villages settled by ethnic Germans: The Lutheran villages of Schlangendorf and Mühlhausendorf and the Roman Catholic village of Klosterdorf. In the nineteenth century, the whole region, and large parts of southern Russia, contained villages settled by Germans belonging to various Protestant faiths, particularly Lutherans and Mennonites, as well as Roman Catholics.

In April 2022, Russian military forces reached Gammalsvenskby as part of the Russian invasion of Ukraine. The village remained occupied until 11 November 2022, when it was reclaimed by the Ukrainian army. After the Ukrainian liberation, Russia has repeatedly targeted the civilian population in Gammalsvenskby with bombings, including use of white phosphorus munitions.

== History ==
=== Resettlement of Estonian Swedes and founding of Gammalsvenskby ===
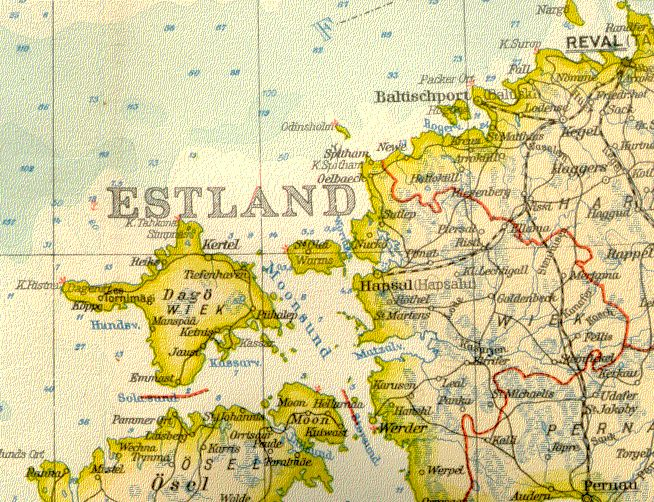
Dagö, Estonia

The population of Gammalsvenskby traces its origins to Hiiumaa (Dagö) in present-day Estonia, once a part of the Duchy of Estonia. Under the Treaty of Nystad, the island was among the territory ceded to the Russian Empire in 1721 at the end of the Great Northern War.

A few decades later, a portion of the peasant population in conflict with the local aristocracy, answered Catherine the Great's 1762 ukase calling for settlers in Novorossiya on territory newly conquered from the Ottoman Empire; today this land is in Southern Ukraine. Enticed by promises of new fertile land along the Dnieper, about 1,200 people departed Dagö on 20 August 1780, and trekked overland to Novorossiya, arriving on 1 May 1781. Only about 400 Swedes remained behind in Dagö.

Regardless of the impetus, the outcome of this mass migration was disastrous. Of the 1,200 villagers who left Estonia, only 900 made it to Novorossiya. On arrival, there was no trace of the houses they had expected to find. Moreover, during their first year in Ukraine, an even larger portion of the settlers died, mainly due to dysentery. That first year, 318 died along with another 116 the following year. By 1794, only 224 people remained in Gammalsvenskby. In 1802, the Russian government ordered all male Swedes to marry by the age of 30 in an effort to boost the population.

=== Maintaining the Swedish heritage ===
From 1787 to 1805, German colonists were invited to Gammalsvenskby to bolster the region's population. The Germans referred to the area as the "Schwedengebiet" (Swedish District) and the village as "Alt-Schwedendorf". They soon founded three neighbouring villages: Schlangendorf, Mühlhausendorf, and Klosterdorf. With the arrival of these Germans, the Swedes were quickly outnumbered and eventually many of the area's pastors and teachers were German-speakers who did not know Swedish.

Although the Swedes did not make full use of the arable land they had been allocated — they focused their industry more on fishing than farming — the reallocation of farm land to the German newcomers strained relations between Gammalsvenskby's Swedes and their German neighbors, although intermarriage between the communities did occur, as is evidenced by parish register entries for weddings in both communities' churches. While the Swedes and Germans were sometimes rivals, they were never enemies and the two communities cooperated when times were bad.

Despite this, the people of Gammalsvenskby maintained their traditions, Church of Sweden Lutheran faith, and old Swedish dialect. At the end of the 19th century, some ties with Sweden were re-established, with the Ukrainian Swedes viewed as a "lost tribe" that preserved older Swedish traditions, such as writing in runes and maintaining an older form of the Church of Sweden's liturgy. Prince Carl raised more than 6,000 rubles in Sweden and Finland to support construction of a new Swedish church in the village to replace the previous wooden church given by Prince Potemkin that burned in the mid-19th century. The new parish church of St. John opened in 1885. For a time, before the revolutions that followed World War I, visits from Sweden became frequent, and some villagers subscribed to Swedish newspapers.

Despite this, there were efforts by Russia to better integrate the Ukrainian Swedes with the Russian Empire. The original settlement plans exempted Ukrainian Swedes from conscription into the tsar's army, but this changed by the end of the 1800s and 130 men from Gammalsvenskby were inducted into the Russian army during World War I.

=== Relocation attempt to Sweden ===
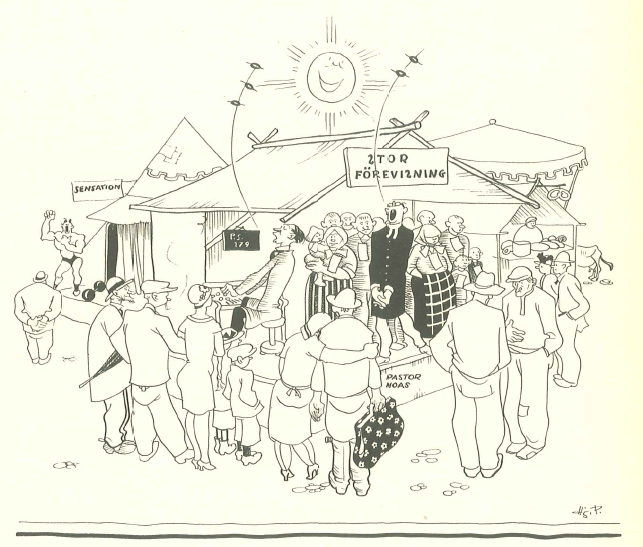
Caricature of the Gammalsvenskby returnees published in the Swedish Communist newspaper Folkets Dagblad Politiken, August 1929. The picture portrays the settlers as entertainers, being put to display at a community fair in Ljungby.

During the Russian Civil War, Gammalsvenskby was largely held by the Red Army, although the village did come under artillery fire from the White Army under General Anton Denikin. After fighting moved away from the villages in 1921, villagers sought aid from Sweden, including writing to Archbishop of Uppsala Nathan Söderblom. In 1922, the Swedish Red Cross led an expedition to Gammalsvenskby to provide aid and guidance in developing the region and its farmland. Under this plan, two new Swedish villages, Nysvenskby ("New Swedish Village") and Svenskåker ("Swedish Field"), were established in part to preserve their right to the land. The neighboring German villages similarly established additional outposts, Friedenheim and Neuklosterdorf.

Conflicts with Soviet authorities over taxation, collectivization policies, and the right to maintain their Lutheran faith increased the efforts by some villagers to seek return to Sweden. On 1 September 1927, 136 farmers from the village petitioned "the people of Sweden, Finland, and America" for aid to reunite them with their fellow Swedes. These efforts were not immediately embraced by Sweden's representative to Moscow, Carl Gerhard von Heidenstam, who urged caution. On 28 June 1928, 429 villagers voted to emigrate back to Sweden under the Declaration of the Rights of the Peoples of Russia's support for ethnic self-determination. At this time, pressure in Sweden to allow the return of the people from Gammalsvenskby increased, and on 22 February 1929, the Riksdag approved their right to come to Sweden. By June 1929, the Soviet government reached an agreement with the Swedes regarding disposition of their property in Ukraine and passport fees, and most of the people of Gammalsvenskby began preparing to leave. The villagers could only take with them what could be packed on a passenger train.

On 22 July 1929, the Swedes of Gammalsvenskby who had received an exit permit were brought downriver to Kherson on two steamers. From there, the Swedish Red Cross brought them on the cargo ship Firuzan to Constanța, Romania, where the overland journey began. They travelled by train through Hungary and Austria to Germany, passing through Sinaia, Brașov, Lőkösháza, Budapest, Vienna, Passau, and Stralsund on the way to Sassnitz. From there, they took the ferry across the Baltic Sea to Sweden. On 1 August 1929, 885 Ukrainian Swedes arrived in Trelleborg, Sweden, where they were received by Prince Carl, Duke of Västergötland. Of those who opted to remain in Gammalsvenskby, 19 families (94 people) soon moved on to Manitoba, Canada, where earlier emigrants from Gammalsvenskby had settled. Six of these families later returned to Sweden.

The majority of the villagers stayed in Sweden, many of them settling in Gotland, as well as in Västergötland and Småland. In an effort to integrate these "ancient Swedes" with modern Sweden, officials did not allow them to stay in a single, common settlement. Instead, the government took a very paternalistic approach towards the Gammalsvenskby emigrants, requiring them to apprentice with established farmers to learn Swedish agricultural practices.

About four months after arriving in Sweden, some emigrants requested to return to Ukraine. Peter Knutas and Waldemar Utas wrote to the Ukrainian SSR that the move to Sweden was a thoughtless step and sought permission for three families to return to Ukraine. Some emigrants also joined the Communist Party of Sweden in hope of reflecting their loyalty to Soviet authorities. The movement of Ukrainian Swedes — both to Sweden and then back to the Ukrainian SSR — was used for propaganda purposes by both anti-Soviet and pro-Soviet media.

=== Soviet repression, Holodomor, and World War II ===
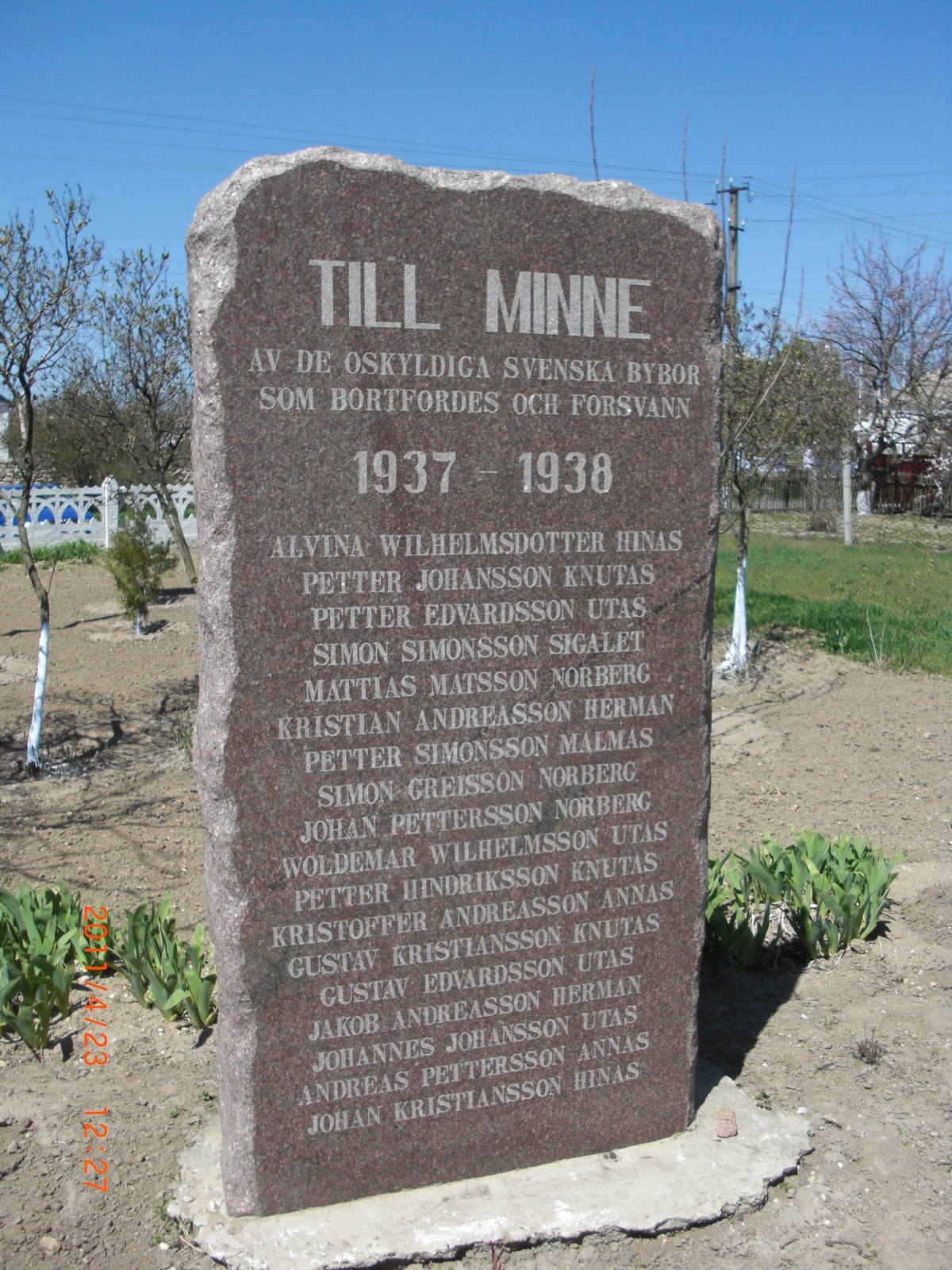
Memorial to the 16 men and one woman from Gammalsvenskby who were killed or disappeared in the Stalinist purge of 1937–1938.

In total, around 250 villagers chose to return to Gammalsvenskby. With the support of the Communist Party of Sweden, they established a minor collective farm called Röd Svenskby (Red Swedish Village).

Life in the Soviet Union was ultimately difficult. In 1929, the church in Gammalsvenskby was closed by the Soviet government. The famine of 1932–1933 renewed interest in the idea of returning to Sweden, and some villagers signed a list stating that they wanted to leave the country. This led to the arrest of 20 people by the secret police, the GPU. Five of them were sent to prison. Several villagers were killed in the Stalinist purge of the following years. In the 1930s, the majority of the 3,500 Scandinavian descendants living in the Southern Ukraine were accused of spying and sent with their families to katorga in Siberia and Karelia.

With the Nazi invasion of the Soviet Union, the German army arrived in Gammalsvenskby on 25 August 1941, where the soldiers were welcomed as liberators. During the Nazis' three-year occupation, they granted the Swedish Ukrainians German citizenship and many of the men from Gammalsvenskby joined the German forces — both voluntarily and through conscription. As Soviet troops advanced in October 1943, Swedes and Germans were removed from the Reichskommissariat Ukraine under Germany's evacuation plans. Many evacuees from Gammalsvenskby ended up in Krotoschyn, in the German Warthegau that had been annexed from Poland. Nearly 150 residents of Gammalsvenskby were caught by Soviet authorities at the end of the war and sent to labor camps, but were allowed to return to Ukraine as early as 1947. Others managed to go to Sweden or directly back to Gammalsvenskby.

In 1947, under a Soviet policy to remove Germanic place names, Schlangendorf became Zmiivka, Mühlhausendorf became Mykhailivka, and Klosterdorf became Kostirka. Gammalsvenskby was renamed Verbivka.

In 1951, after the exchange of territories by Poland and the Soviet Union, around 2,500 people were relocated to the area from the Drohobych Oblast villages of Lodyna, Dolyshni Berehy, and Naniv. Due to the resulting increase in population, the four villages were united under the name Zmiivka. With this migration, Zmiivka became home to the largest Boykos (Ukrainian Highlander) diaspora in Kherson Oblast, making up nearly 80% of the villagers. The newly relocated populace was officially prohibited from celebrating their traditional holidays, such as Vertep during Christmas. To make matters worse, the locals among whom they were settled considered the newcomers to be anti-Soviet nationalists.

In 1955 the Kakhovka Dam was constructed on the Dnieper, creating the Kakhovka Reservoir. This submerged part of the village along with several islands and fishing waters. On 6 June 2023, the dam was destroyed while it was under control of the Russian forces during the Russian invasion in 2022.

=== Since 1991 ===
Swedish Tre Kronor

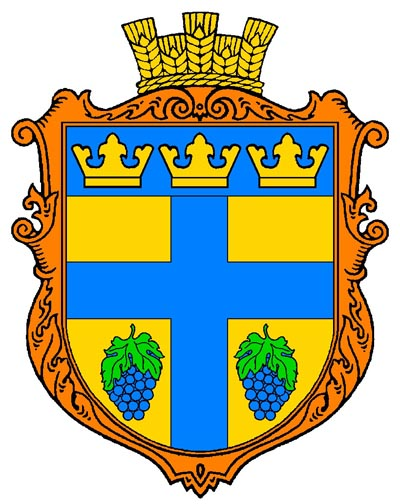
Tre Kronor in Zmiivka

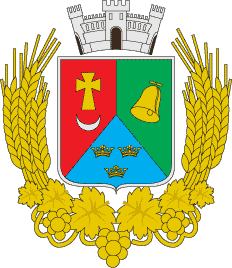
Tre Kronor in Beryslav Raion

Prior to the fall of the Soviet Union, contacts with Sweden and Canada were re-established, and in the 1990s the Church of Sweden, Gotland Municipality, and other Swedish organizations lent economic support and led relief efforts. Chumak, a Swedish-owned producer of oil, ketchup and canned food, was established in the nearby town of Kakhovka. In early October 2008, King Carl XVI Gustaf and Queen Silvia visited Zmiivka and Gammalsvenskby as part of a state visit to Ukraine.

As of 2016, the village had only around 108 people who share a Swedish cultural heritage. Only a few of them still speak the local Swedish dialect fluently and German is often used instead. However, the Swedish heritage is reflected in Zmiivka's emblem, which incorporates the Swedish national symbol (the Tre Kronor), as well as a blue cross on a yellow field, which inverses the Swedish flag's colors. On 15 April 2001, Gotland signed a sister city agreement with the village. Tourism from Sweden remains an important aspect of the village's economy and an impetus for preservation of the Gammalsvenska dialect.

The whole of Beryslav Raion is now heavily Ukrainianized due to the resettlement of many people from western Ukraine in the region, including to the local villages of Lvivski Otruby, Lvove, and Tarasa Shevchenka.

==== Russian invasion of Ukraine ====
During the Russian invasion of Ukraine, Gammalsvenskby was occupied by Russian troops, who later destroyed a monument dedicated to Ukrainian independence in the village. During the 2022 annexation referendums in Russian-occupied Ukraine, the Russian occupiers shut off the internet and mobile communications in the village, and the population of Gammalsvenskby refused to take part in the balloting. People reportedly locked themselves in their homes, refusing to open their doors, although some people did manage to vote no.

During the 2022 Kherson counteroffensive, the village was about 10 to 15 kilometres (6.2 to 9.3 mi) southeast of the frontlines, and it was reported that the population was hoping for liberation by Ukrainian forces. The village was liberated by the Ukrainian army on 11 November 2022, following Russian troops' withdrawal to the left (east) bank of the Dnieper.

After the liberation by Ukrainian forces, Russia has continued to target the village, in one attack destroying the local school in a bombing attack that killed one and wounded one of the school's employees. The village has also been the target of several attacks by Russia making use of white phosphorus munitions to deliberately cause as much devastation to the local civilian population as possible. These attacks have been described as direct terror bombings targeted at civilians as the village is not of any particular military value. These bombings are under investigation for possible war crimes. Russian drones have also targeted individual civilians walking the streets, as well as humanitarian aid cars. Due to the constant bombings, and lack of electricity and water, many residents have fled to neighbouring villages. Due to Gammalsvenskby's close proximity to the Kakhovka Dam, its destruction created another water supply threat for the village.

On 11 November 2023, exactly one year after the liberation of Gammalsvenskby, it was reported that 80% to 90% of the village had been destroyed and that only about 200 people remained, mostly elderly or ill. In June and July 2024, Russian drones destroyed two churches in Gammalsvenskby, one of them being the local Swedish church. In December 2024, it was reported that Russian drones were laying anti-personnel mines disguised as leaves around the village. In September 2025, the village's population had declined to just four people.

== See also ==
- Estonian Swedes
- Kherson Oblast
- Oleksandr Khvylia
- Black Sea Germans
- Swedes of Gammalsvenskby

== External links and further reading ==
- The Svenskbyborna Society in Sweden (in Swedish)
- Svenskbymuséet museum in Roma, Gotland
- History of Gammalsvenskby
- "Gammalsvenskby: A Swedish village in Ukraine" (PDF). Hidden Europe. No. 8. May 2006. pp. 40–43. Archived from the original on 13 July 2006.
- Wawrzeniuk, Piotr; Malitska, Julia (2014). The Lost Swedish Tribe: Reapproaching the history of Gammalsvenskby in Ukraine. Södertörns högskola. ISBN 978-91-86069-85-8. Archived from the original on 1 February 2022.
- Holmbro, Emma; Dahllof, Ake (7 August 2009). "Ukraine III – Gammalsvenskby". TravelBlog.
- Knutas, Kjell. "Gammalsvenskby i Ukrania" [Gammalsvenskby in Ukraine]. Norra Kyrketorps församling (in Swedish). Archived from the original on 5 February 2005.
- Прядко, Инна (28 September 2011). "Шведская семья. Как живет шведская община в селе на Херсонщине" [Swedish family. How does the Swedish community live in a village in the Kherson region]. Корреспондент (in Russian). No. 37.
- Ullman, Tommie; Öhlén, Mats (28 October 2009). "A Swedish Village in Ukraine". Stockholm News. Archived from the original on 22 November 2009.
