= Estonian National Council in Sweden =

Organisation

The Estonian National Council in Sweden was established in 1947 and was one of the oldest and largest Estonian central organisations in Sweden. The Estonian National Council was a broad coalition of Estonian political parties in exile, which maintained close contacts with Swedish democratic political parties. The main task of the ENC was the preservation and development of Estonian national and cultural heritage in exile. The ENC consisted of prominent Estonian personalities and supporters of various nationalities, 9000 people in total.

The representatives of the ENC had participated in 1000 international conferences, working for breaking the westward advance of communist totalitarianism and preserving Estonian national identity in anticipation of the time when Estonia would be a free nation, which occurred after the collapse of Soviet Union.
