= Estonian Swedish =

Dialects of Swedish spoken in Estonia

- estlandssvenska
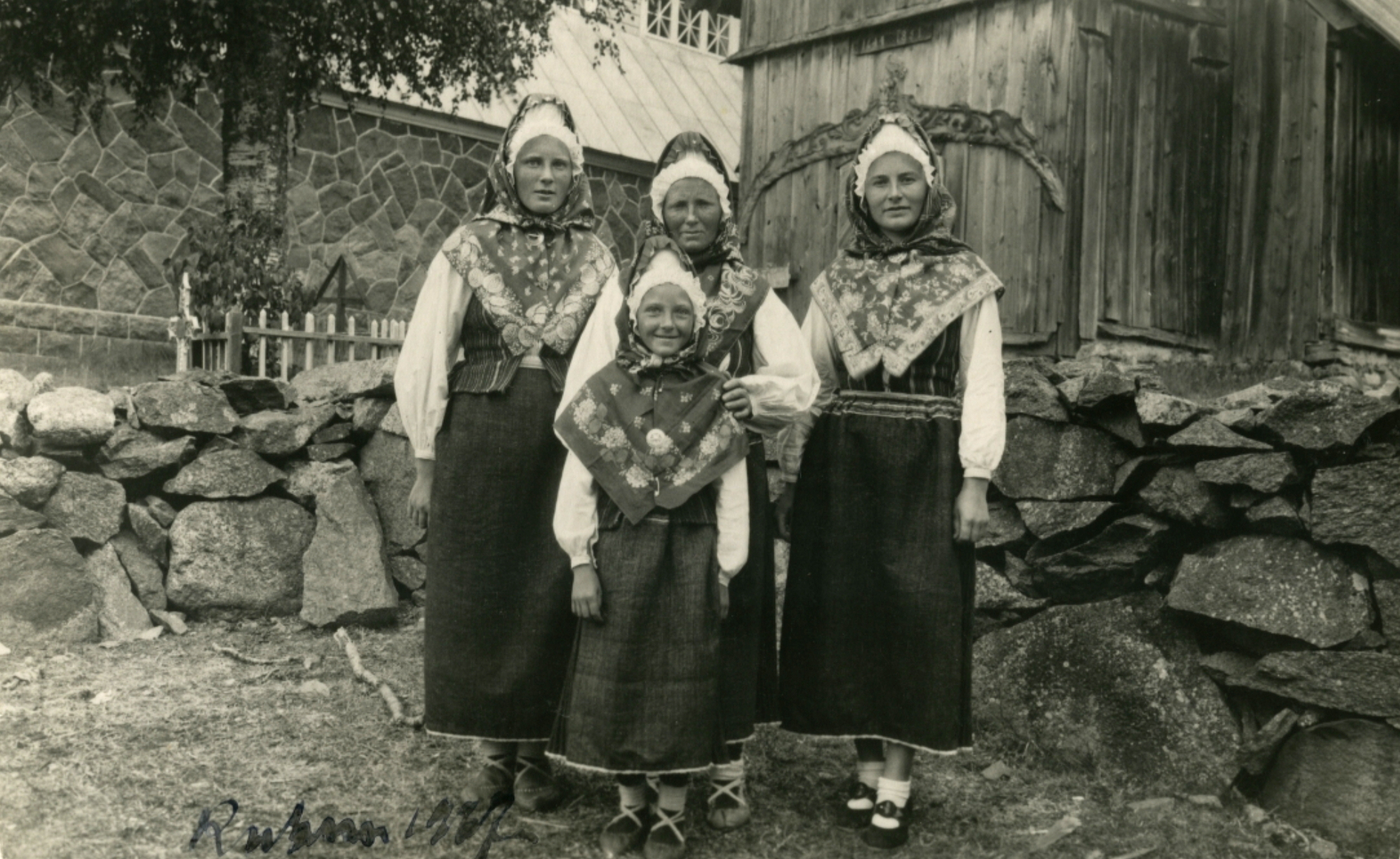
- Estonian Swedes on Ruhnu, 1937
- Region: Estonia, Ukraine, Sweden
- Language family: Indo-European: Germanic; North Germanic; East Scandinavian; Swedish; East Swedish; Estonian Swedish
- Dialects: Gammalsvenska; Runska

Language codes
- ISO 639-3: –
- Glottolog: esto1259
- IETF: sv-EE

Estonian Swedish (Swedish: estlandssvenska; Estonian: rannarootsi keel, lit. 'Coastal Swedish') are the eastern varieties of the Swedish language that were until the mid-20th century spoken in the Aiboland, the coastal areas and islands of western and northern Estonia which had been inhabited since the Middle Ages by the Estonian Swedes.

Until the evacuation of the Estonian Swedes near the end of World War II, both Swedish and Estonian were commonly spoken in the Aiboland coastal areas and islands. Today, small groups of remaining Estonian Swedes are regrouping and re-establishing their heritage, by studying the Swedish language and culture. They are led by the Estonian Swedish Council, which is backed by the Estonian government. In 2000, Swedes were the 21st largest ethnic group in Estonia, numbering only 300. There are however many elderly native speakers of Estonian Swedish as well as descendants of Estonian Swedes residing in Sweden.

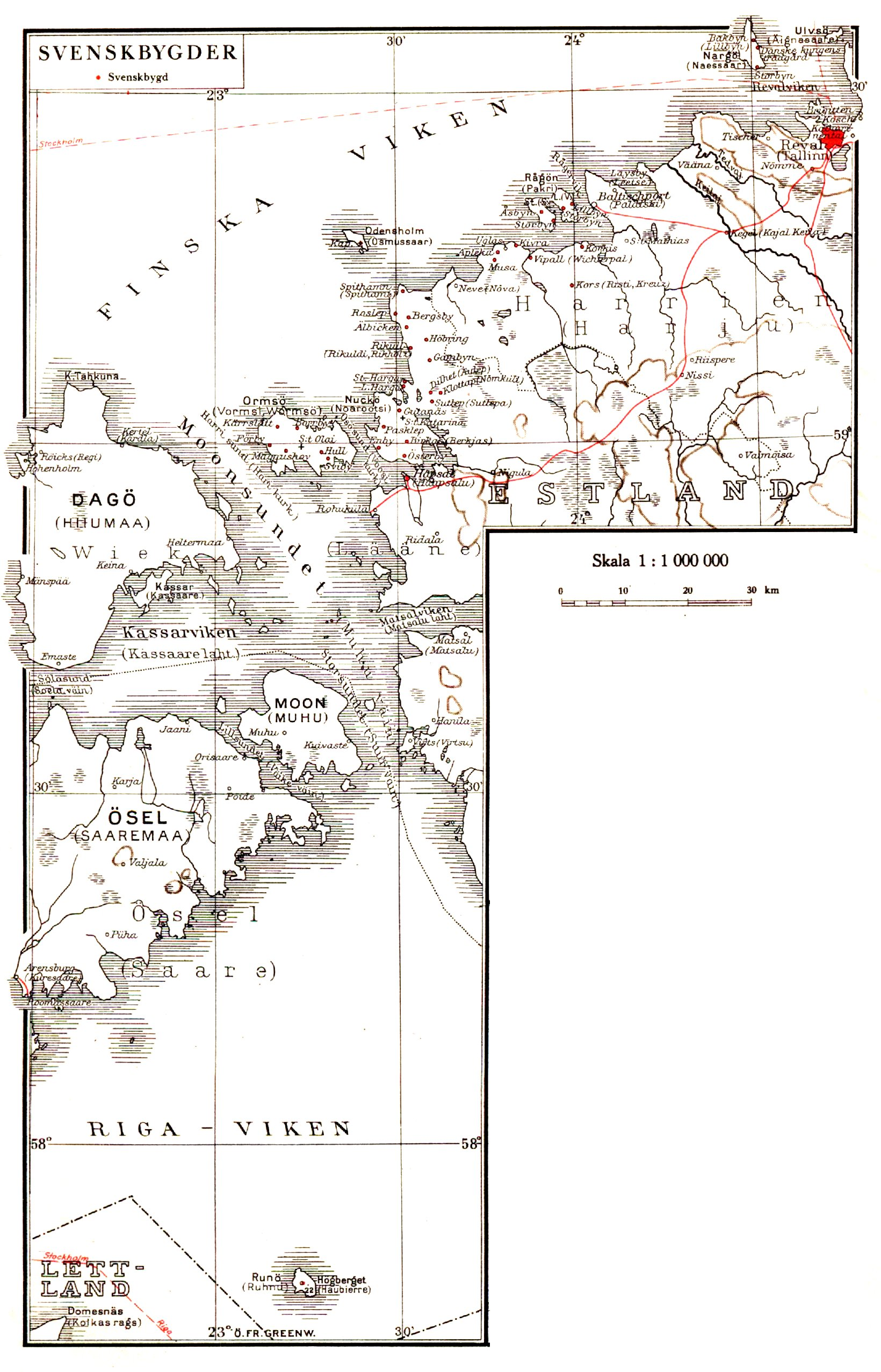
A Swedish language map of the Estonian coast from the 1930s.

Currently, the number of native speakers is unknown, but assumed to be low.

== Usage ==
According to Henrik Rosenkvist, the Estonian island of Naissaar had lost its original Estonian Swedish population by the early 1700s. It was resettled in by Finland Swedish farmers from Uusimaa who brought the Nyland dialect with them.

The Gammalsvenska dialect of Swedish spoken in Ukraine is an archaic dialect of Estonian Swedish, having been brought to the village of Gammalsvenskby in the late 1700s by settlers from Hiiumaa (Dagö).

== Writing system ==
Noarootsi Swedish is written with the same letters as Standard Swedish with a few phonetic additions:

- Long vowels are indicated with a subscribed macron: ⟨a̱, ä̱, å̱, e̱, i̱, o̱, u̱⟩.
- Long consonants are doubled : ⟨bb, dd, ...⟩.
- The /d/ and /n/ rhotics are denoted with a dot below ⟨ḍ, ṇ⟩.
- The voiced retroflex flap /ɽ/, called "thick L", is noted with a dot below ⟨ḷ⟩.
- The voiceless postalveolar fricative consonant /ʃ/ is noted with a dot below ⟨ṣ⟩.

== See also ==
- Swedish language
- Standard Swedish
- Finland Swedish
- Swedish dialects
  - Gammalsvenska
