= Gammalsvenska =

Estonian Swedish dialect of Ukraine

- Gammölsvänsk
- Region: Gammalsvenskby, Zmiivka, Kherson Oblast, Ukraine
- Ethnicity: Svenskbybor
- Native speakers: 10 (2014) c. 30 (2024) (incl. non-fluent)
- Language family: Indo-European: Germanic; North Germanic; East Scandinavian; Swedish; East Swedish; Estonian Swedish; Dagösvenska; Gammalsvenska
- Writing system: Latin alphabet, medieval runes

Language codes
- ISO 639-3: –
- IETF: sv-UA

Gammalsvenska (locally Gammölsvänsk; literally "Old Swedish") is an Estonian Swedish dialect spoken in the neighborhood of Gammalsvenskby in Zmiivka, Ukraine. Its use has declined since the end of World War II, and most remaining speakers are older residents of Gammalsvenskby.

== History ==
It derives from the Estonian Swedish dialect of the late 1700s as spoken on the island of Dagö (Hiiumaa). While rooted in Swedish, the dialect shows influence and borrowings from Estonian, German, Russian, and Ukrainian.

Prior to 1929, Gammalsvenska remained the first language for the Ukrainian Swedes; however, the last generation of Swedish-first speakers were born just after World War II Sovietization policies. Marriage into non-Swedish families and social pressures diminished the teaching of Gammalsvenska by parents to their children. Since the 1950s a Russian-Ukrainian surzhyk has been the dominant language in the village, although some Standard Swedish is taught in schools where it is seen as economically advantageous for jobs in local tourism and other employment opportunities. Use of Gammalsvenska is restricted mostly to older ethnic Swedes born in the 1920s or 1930s. As of 2014 only about 10 fluent Gammalsvenska speakers, all elderly women, were known in Ukraine. In 2024 Sofia Hoas, chairwoman of Föreningen Svenskbyborna (Association of Gammalsvenskby settlers), stated that about 30 people in the village still speak Swedish with varied proficiency. According to Yle reporter Anders Mård, all of them are elderly women.

In Meadows, Manitoba, where most of the immigrants from Gammalsvenskby to Canada eventually settled, Gammalsvenska was retained into the early 1900s. However, as of 2004, only a handful of elderly speakers remain.

== Phonology ==
The first detailed description of Gammalsvenskby dialect's phonology is found in Anton Karlgren's Gammalsvenskby. Uttal och ordböjning i Gammalsvenskbymålet ("Pronunciation and morphology of the Gammalsvenskby dialect"), written in 1906 and published in 1953. The article's description of the dialect is mainly based on the usage of four native speakers: Andreas Andersson Utas (born in 1883), Kristoff Hoas (born in 1877), Simon Hoas (born in the 1860s) and Mats Petersson Annas (born in the 1840s).

In another article published in 2020, Linguist Alexander Markov described the Gammalsvenska's phonology on the basis of three speakers' speech production: Anna Lyutko (born in 1931), Melitta Prasolova (born in 1926) and Lidia Utas (born in 1933). The phonology of Gammalsvenska is characterized by the lack of rounded front vowels /y:/ and /øː/. The open vowel /œː/ appears only as an allophone. Furthermore, two so-called 'primary diphthongs', /ɛi/ and /œʉ/, have been retained in speech. In terms of consonants, the voiced retroflex flap [ɽ] appears, and the occlusives /p t k/ are unaspirated. The velar consonants /g/ and /k/ preceding front vowels have not become palatalized, and /s/ has developed the allophone [z] due to assimilation. Similar to the rest of Eastern Swedish dialects, Gammalsvenska does not use pitch accent.

=== Vowels ===
According to Mankov, the dialect has 6 short and 7 long vowel phonemes.

Short vowels
	Front	Central	Back
Close	i	ɞ	u
Mid	ɛ (e)	ɞ	o
Open	a		

Long vowels
	Front	Central	Back
Close	iː	ʉː	uː
Close-mid	eː	ʉː	oː
Open-mid	ɛː	ʉː	oː
Open	aː		

=== Diphthongs ===
Gammalsvenska retains the usage of two diphthongs, /ɛːi̯/ and /œːʉ̯/, which have developed out of the Old Norse diphthongs *ei and *au. They are mostly long, and tend to match the Standard Swedish /eː/ and /øː/. Compare [hɛːi̯m] and hem ("home"), or [lœːʉ̯k] and lök ("onion"). Before long consonants or consonant clusters, however, the diphthongs are shortened, for example in [ɛilːd] "fire". In certain words, other diphthongs might appear as well, an example being [bai̯t] "after" (developed from bak-efter "back-after")

=== Prosody ===
Gammalsvenska usually places stress on the first syllable. This remains the case even in compounds, though with strong secondary stress on the second element. In some compounds, however, primary stress is placed on the second element, such as in [jʉːɛ̯ɽˈaftar] "Christmas Eve", and certain prefixes are never stressed at all (e.g. be- in bedrág, "receive", or fär- in färsvinn, "disappear"), in which Gammalsvenska is similar to Standard Swedish.

== Vocabulary ==
Comparison of Gammalsvenska's vocabulary with other languages
Words	Gammalsvenska	Cognate
duck, ducks	paṭṭa, paṭṭana	Estonian: part, pardid; cf. Estonian essive singular: pardina
potato, potatoes	káḍfl/katüfl, katüflar	Swedish: kartoffel, kartofflar; cf. German: Kartoffel, Kartoffeln; Estonian: kartul, kartulid
carrot, carrots	pürkan, pürkanar	Estonian: porgand, porgandid; cf. Swedish: morot, morötter
pumpkin, pumpkins	kärps, kärpsar	Swedish: kurbits, kurbitsar; cf. German: Kürbis, Kürbisse; Estonian: kõrvits, kõrvitsad
sky	himmäl	Swedish: himmel, German: Himmel
knot	knjüt	Swedish: knut; cf. dialectal: knjüt; German: Knoten
boot, boots	stövl, stövla	Swedish: stövel, stövlar; cf. German: Stiefel
tomato, tomatoes	bokleẓáne, bokleẓáner	Russian or Ukrainian: баклажaн, baklažán; cf. Swedish: tomat, tomater; German: Tomate, Tomaten; Estonian: tomtat, tomatid
pear	düllje	Ukrainian: дуля, dúlya; cf. Swedish: päron; Estonian: pirn; German: Birne
orange (fruit)	aplsī́n	Swedish: apelsin, Estonian: apelsin
