= Padise Parish =

Former municipality of Estonia

Coordinates: 59.216667°N 24.15°E

Padise Parish Padise vald
- Former municipality of Estonia
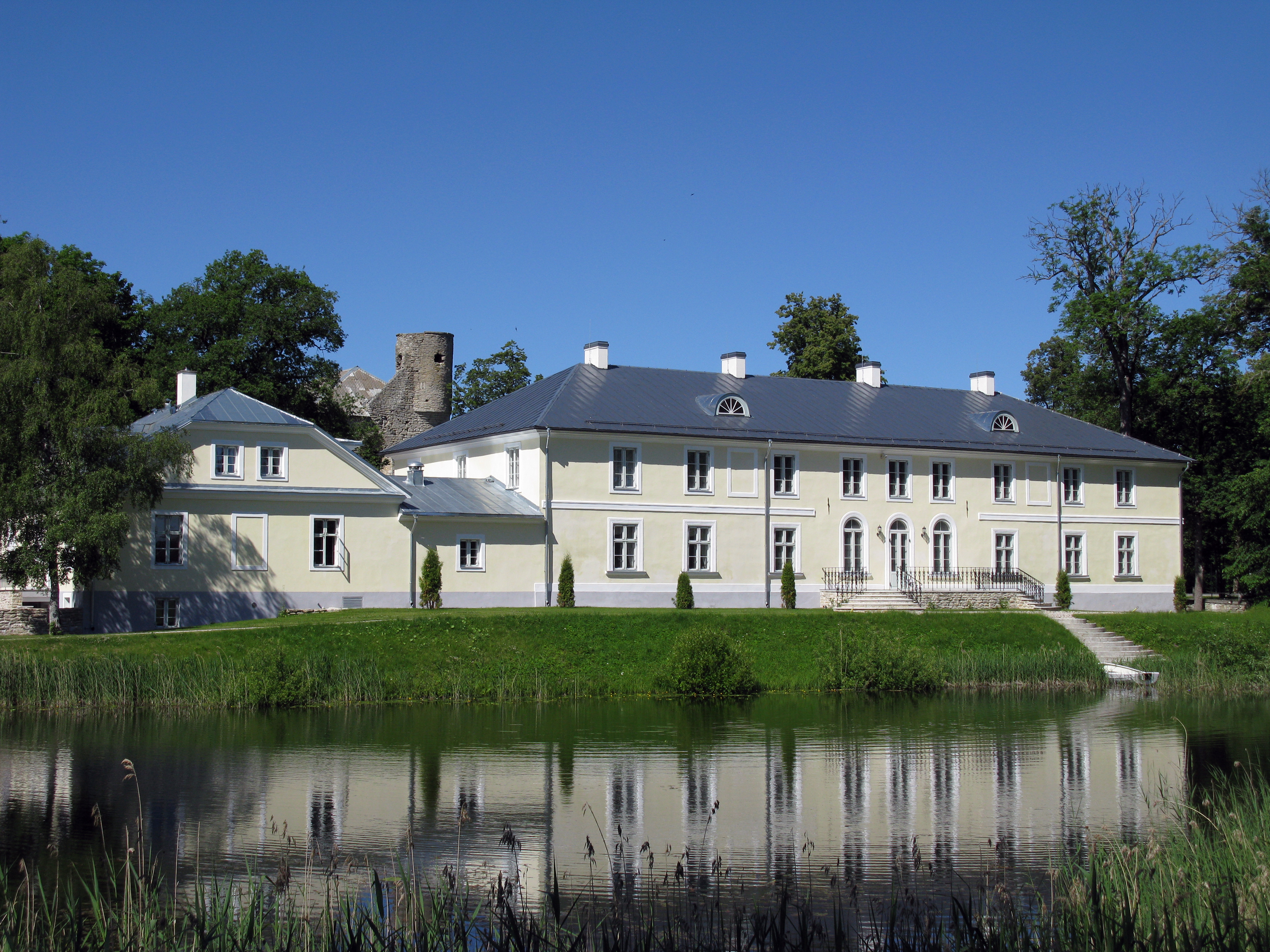
- Padise Manor

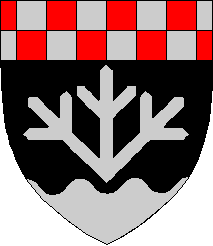
- Flag Coat of arms

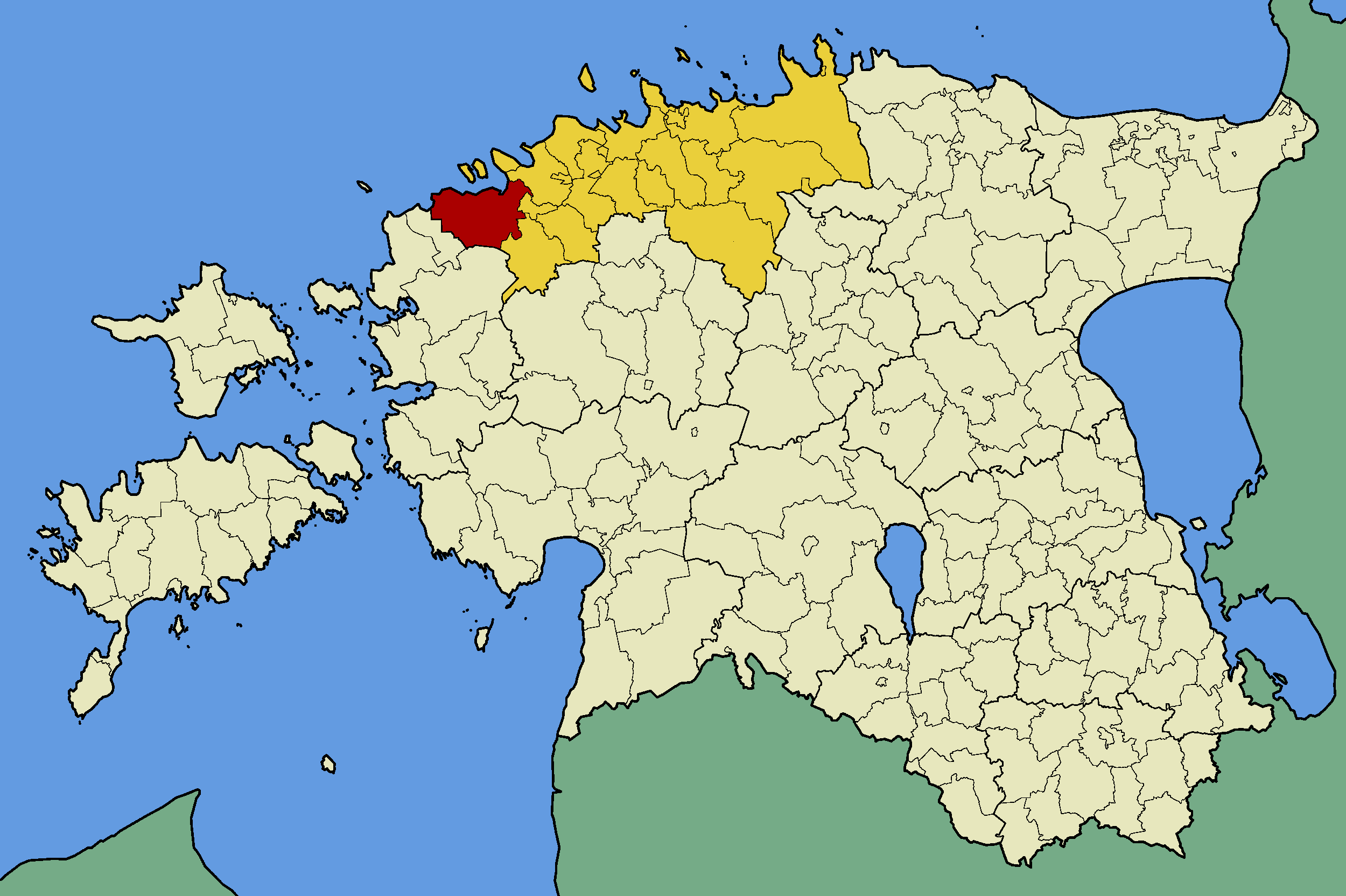
- Padise Parish within Harju County
- Country: Estonia
- County: Harju County
- Administrative centre: Padise

Government
  - Mayor: Leemet Vaikmaa

Area
  - Total: 366.55 km^{2} (141.53 sq mi)

Population (2004)
  - Total: 1,771
  - Density: 4.832/km^{2} (12.51/sq mi)
- Website: www.padise.ee

Padise Parish (Estonian: Padise vald) was a rural municipality in Harju County, north-western Estonia. It covered an area of 366.55 km^{2} (141.53 sq mi) and had a population of 1,771 as of 2004.

The administrative centre of Padise Parish was Padise village. It is located 47 km (29 mi) south-west from Estonia's capital, Tallinn.

== History ==
The Padise name is first mentioned in a 1283 letter from King Eric V of Denmark, which confirmed the acquisition of the landed property for the future Cistercian Padise Abbey. In 1305 Eric VI of Denmark gave permission to the monks from Dünamünde to build a fortified monastery in Padise, the construction of which began in 1317. In 1343 - at the time of St. George's Night Uprising - the first floor and part of the main floor walls were finished. The monastery was burnt down and 28 monks, lay brothers and German vassals were killed. The rebuilding of the monastery began only after 1370 and the consecration of the main building took place as late as 1448. The monastery ceased to exist in 1559 during the Livonian War.

== Local government ==
The mayor (vallavanem) was Leemet Vaikmaa.

== Geography ==
=== Populated places ===
There were 24 villages (est: külad, sg. küla) in Padise Parish: Alliklepa, Altküla, Änglema, Audevälja, Harju-Risti, Hatu, Karilepa, Kasepere, Keibu, Kobru, Kõmmaste, Kurkse, Laane, Langa, Määra, Madise, Metslõugu, Padise, Pae, Pedase, Suurküla, Vihterpalu, Vilivalla, Vintse.

== Twin towns – sister cities ==
Padishe Parish is twinned with:

- Raisio, Finland
