= List of disasters in Estonia by death toll =

The following list of disasters in Estonia is a list of major disasters (excluding conventional acts of war but including acts of terrorism) which relate to Estonia or involved its citizens, in a definable incident or accident such as a shipwreck, where the loss of life was five or more, while some traffic accidents with under ten victims may be excluded.

== Disasters by death toll ==
| Deaths Italics indicate an estimated figure | Event | Year | Notes |
|---|---|---|---|
| 200,000 | Great Northern War plague outbreak | 1708–1713 | Plague during the Great Northern War, a mere decade after The Great Starvation and just after the Great Frost famine killed ca. 57% of people in Estonia. |
| 70,000–75,000 | The Great Starvation | 1695–1697 | A cold and rainy summer and early autumn frost resulted in crop failure, killing ca. 20% of people in Estonia. |
| 40,000 | Great Frost famine | 1709 | An extraordinarily cold winter resulted in crop failure, killing ca. 11% of people in Estonia. |
| Significant | Plague of 1211–1212 | 1211–1212 | Plague outbreak during the Livonian Crusade devastated the Estonian forces. |
| Significant | Plague of 1532 | 1532 | Plague outbreak. |
| Significant | Plague of 1549–1553 | 1549–1553 | Plague outbreak. |
| Significant | Plagues during the Livonian War | 1561–1580 | Several plague outbreaks during the Livonian War devastated different forces and the civilian population. |
| Significant | Plague of 1601–1606 | 1601–1606 | Plague outbreak during the Polish–Swedish War devastated different forces and the civilian population. |
| Significant | Plague of 1657 | 1657 | Plague outbreak. |
| 2,940 | COVID-19 pandemic | 2020–2021 | The ongoing pandemic has killed 0.89% of all infected in Estonia. |
| 2,236 | 1848–1849 cholera outbreak | 1848–1849 | Cholera outbreak killed 38% of all infected. |
| 852 | MS Estonia | 1994 | Cruise ferry sank in the Baltic Sea en route from Tallinn to Stockholm, Sweden after its visor broke off, killing all but 137 on board. |
| 755 | 1831–1833 cholera outbreak | 1831–1833 | Cholera outbreak killed 40%–55% of all infected. |
| 674 | 1853 cholera outbreak | 1853 | A short pandemic killed ca. 41% of all infected. |
| 200 | 1892–1894 cholera outbreak | 1892–1894 | Cholera outbreak killed 35% of all infected. |
| 177 | Russian monitor Rusalka | 1893 | Monitor mysteriously sank en route from Tallinn to Helsinki, killing all on board. |
| 100 | 1871–1872 cholera outbreak | 1871–1872 | Cholera outbreak mostly devastated the area in and around Tallinn. |
| 68 | Pärnu methanol poisoning incident | 2001 | People in Pärnu county drank counterfeit vodka which had mistakenly been made with toxic methanol instead of ordinary ethanol. |
| 63 | Männiku explosion | 1936 | Ammunition depots exploded in Männiku, killing mostly army personnel. |
| 61 | Puka train accident | 1897 | Military train derailed at Puka, killing mostly personnel of the 95th "Krasnoyarski" Infantry Regiment. |
| 21 | Moe airplane accident | 1977 | An-24 carrying personnel of the Soviet 655th Fighter Aviation Regiment crashed after hitting the chimney of a distillery in Moe, killing all on board. |
| 18 | Kilingi-Nõmme II Primary School fire | 1937 | School burned down after film stock caught fire, killing 1 child on sight, 16 in the coming days, and 1 of their wounds several years later. |
| 14 | Kurkse tragedy | 1997 | Soldiers of the Baltic Peacekeeping Battalion froze in the Kurkse strait en route from Suur-Pakri Island to Kurkse on the mainland by foot on a dangerous training maneuver, killing all but 8 soldiers. |
| 14 | Copterline Flight 103 | 2005 | Commercial transport helicopter en route from Tallinn to Helsinki, Finland crashed into the Tallinn Bay after liftoff, killing all on board. |
| 10 | Jõgeva mail train accident | 1924 | Mail train was derailed possibly by Soviet diversionists at Pedja River near Jõgeva, killing both passengers and crew. |
| 10 | Haapsalu orphanage fire | 2011 | Disabled patients died of carbon monoxide poisoning, while 36 patients were evacuated. |
| 10 | Valdeku shooting-range accident | 1934 | Officer candidates were killed by an accidental bombshell explosion during an Estonian Military Academy exercise. |
| 9 | Petseri fire | 1939 | A fire destroyed a third of the mostly wooden town of Petseri. |
| 9 | Ju 52 Kaleva shootdown | 1940 | Commercial transport airplane en route from Tallinn to Helsinki, Finland was shot down by Soviet bombers above the Gulf of Finland, killing all on board. |
| 9 | Tallinn railway accident | 1980 | Two oncoming trains collided in Baltic Railway Station in Tallinn, killing passengers and crew in both trains. |
| 8 | Pala bus accident | 1996 | A lorry crashed into a school bus at Pala, with 29 survivors in the bus and 1 in the lorry. |
| 6 | Marja store collapse | 1994 | A convenience store collapsed in Mustamäe district, Tallinn, killing 5 customers on site and 1 in hospital. |

== Other significant disasters ==
| Deaths Italics indicate an estimated figure | Event | Year | Notes |
|---|---|---|---|
| 1 | 2005 January storm | 2005 | Cyclone Gudrun caused considerable flooding in Western and Northern Estonian coastal areas. |
| None | Kaali meteorite impact | Ca. 1530–1450 BC | Impact energy of about 80 TJ, incinerating the forests within a 6 km radius. |
| None | Toompea fire | 1684 | A fire destroyed much of Tallinn's upper town Toompea. |
| None | Great fire of Tartu | 1775 | A fire destroyed up to 2/3 of the mostly wooden town of Tartu. |
| None | Sviby fire | 1932 | A fire destroyed almost the entire village of Sviby on Vormsi island. |
| None | Võõpsu fire | 1939 | A fire destroyed almost the entire village of Võõpsu. |

== See also ==
- List of accidents and disasters by death toll (worldwide)
- List of wars involving Estonia
