= Suurküla =

Suurküla may refer to several places in Estonia:

- Suurküla, Harju County, village in Lääne-Harju Parish, Harju County
- Suurküla, Põlva County, village in Põlva Parish, Põlva County
- Suurküla, Rapla County, village in Märjamaa Parish, Rapla County
