= Laurberg =

Laurberg is a Danish surname.

Notable people with the surname Laurberg include:

- Ferdinand Laurberg (1904–1941), Estonian footballer and bandy player
- Ida Laurberg (born 2000), Danish singer and songwriter
- Julie Laurberg (1856–1925), Danish photographer
- Lauritz Laurberg Thrane (1757–1809), Danish master mason architect and builder
