= Laane =

Laane may refer to:

== Places ==
=== Estonia ===
- Laane, Kose Parish, village in Kose Parish, Harju County
- Laane, Lääne-Harju Parish, village in Lääne-Harju Parish, Harju County
- Laane, Tartu County, village in Kambja Parish, Tartu County
- Laane, Viljandi County, village in Põhja-Sakala Parish, Viljandi County
- Lääne County, one of 15 counties of Estonia

== People ==
- Rait-Riivo Laane (born 1993), Estonian basketball player

== Organizations ==
- Lääne Elu, an Estonian language newspaper
