= Vilivalla =

Vilivalla may refer to:

- Vilivalla, Harju County, village in Estonia
- Vilivalla, Hiiu County, village in Estonia
