= Madise, Harju County =

Village in Estonia

Madise
- Village
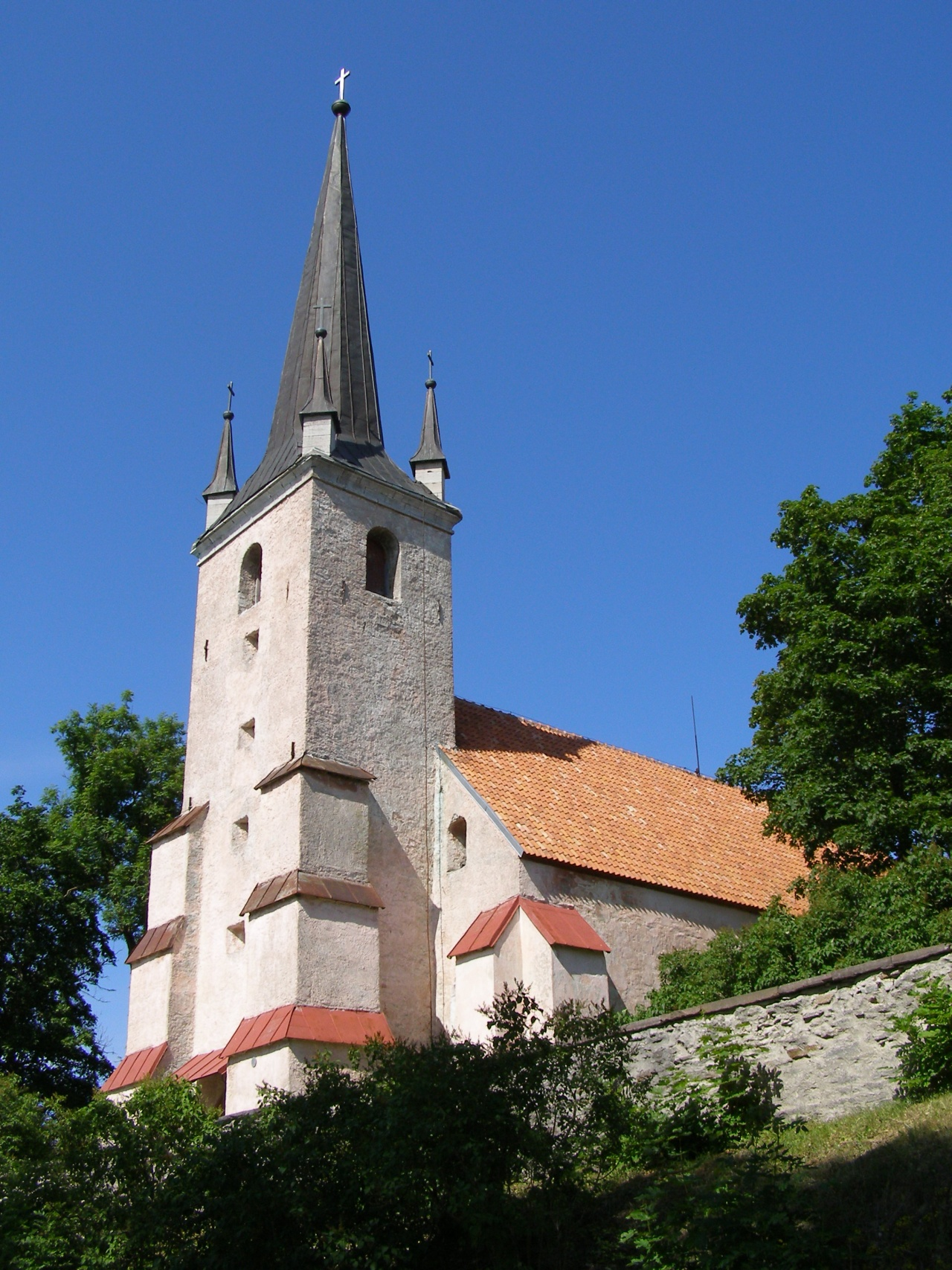
- Harju-Madise Church

- Location in Estonia
- Coordinates: 59°17′23″N 24°7′23″E
- Country: Estonia
- County: Harju County
- Municipality: Lääne-Harju Parish

Madise (also Harju-Madise) is a village in Lääne-Harju Parish, Harju County, Estonia. It is the birthplace of Bengt Gottfried Forselius.

== Harju-Madise Church ==
Harju-Madise Church is located on a high limestone cliff about half a kilometre from the seashore.

The first sanctuary on the site was a small wooden construction that was replaced by a stone construction in the 15th century. Because of the unique position on a high shore the church tower is also used as a lighthouse. Only the western portal of the original church has been preserved to date.

During reconstruction work in 1760–80, the choir, vestry and tower were added to the original building. In middle of nineteenth century the Baltic-German noblemen of Padise (then Padis) and Leetse manors wanted to celebrate the coronation of the new czar, Alexander II, so the tower was built even higher and supported by side pillars.

Inside the church the most outstanding elements are a pulpit carved by Johann Valentin Rabe and a painted shrine donated by the landlord of Põllküla.

== See also ==
- Bengt Gottfried Forselius
- Lääne-Harju Parish
- Harju county
