= Padise =

Village in Estonia

Coordinates: 59°14′N 24°08′E

- Village
- Interactive map of Padise
- Country: Estonia
- County: Harju County
- Parish: Lääne-Harju Parish
- Time zone: UTC+2 (EET)
  - Summer (DST): UTC+3 (EEST)

Padise (German: Padis) is a village in Lääne-Harju Parish, Harju County in northern Estonia.

Padise is the birthplace of Estonian poet and author Arved Viirlaid (1922–2015).

Padise is a place for Padise equestrian centre (Estonian: Padise ratsakeskus).

== Gallery ==
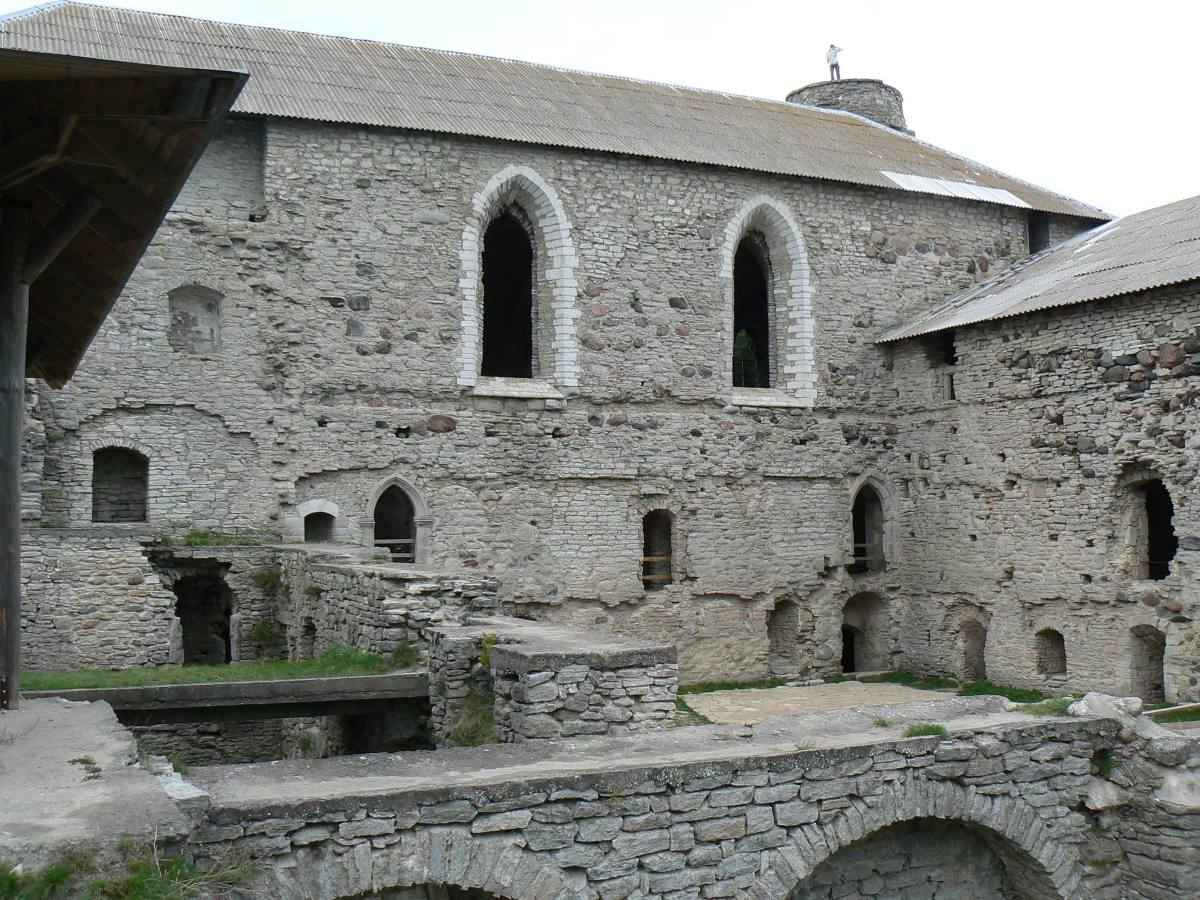
Padise Abbey

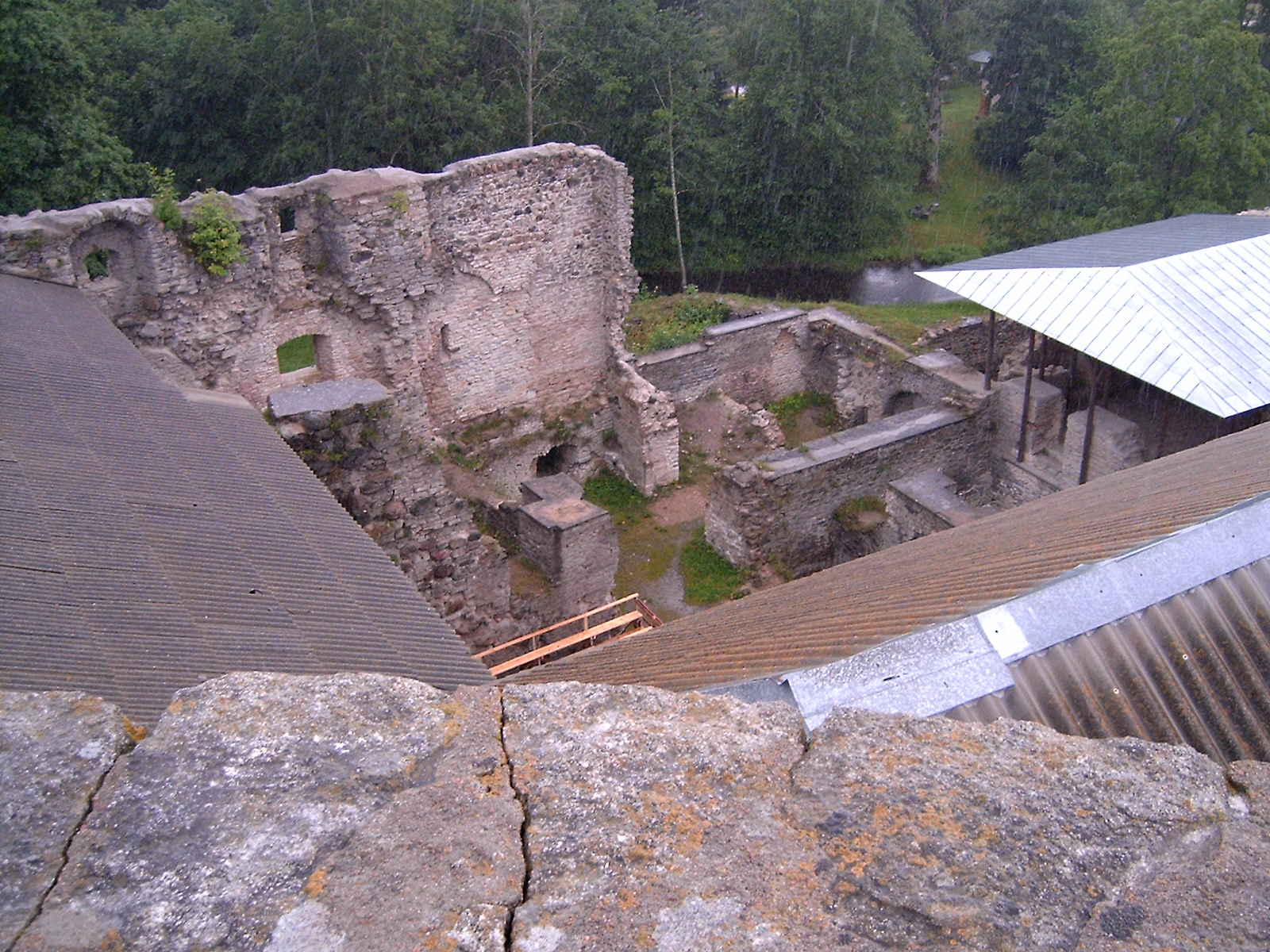

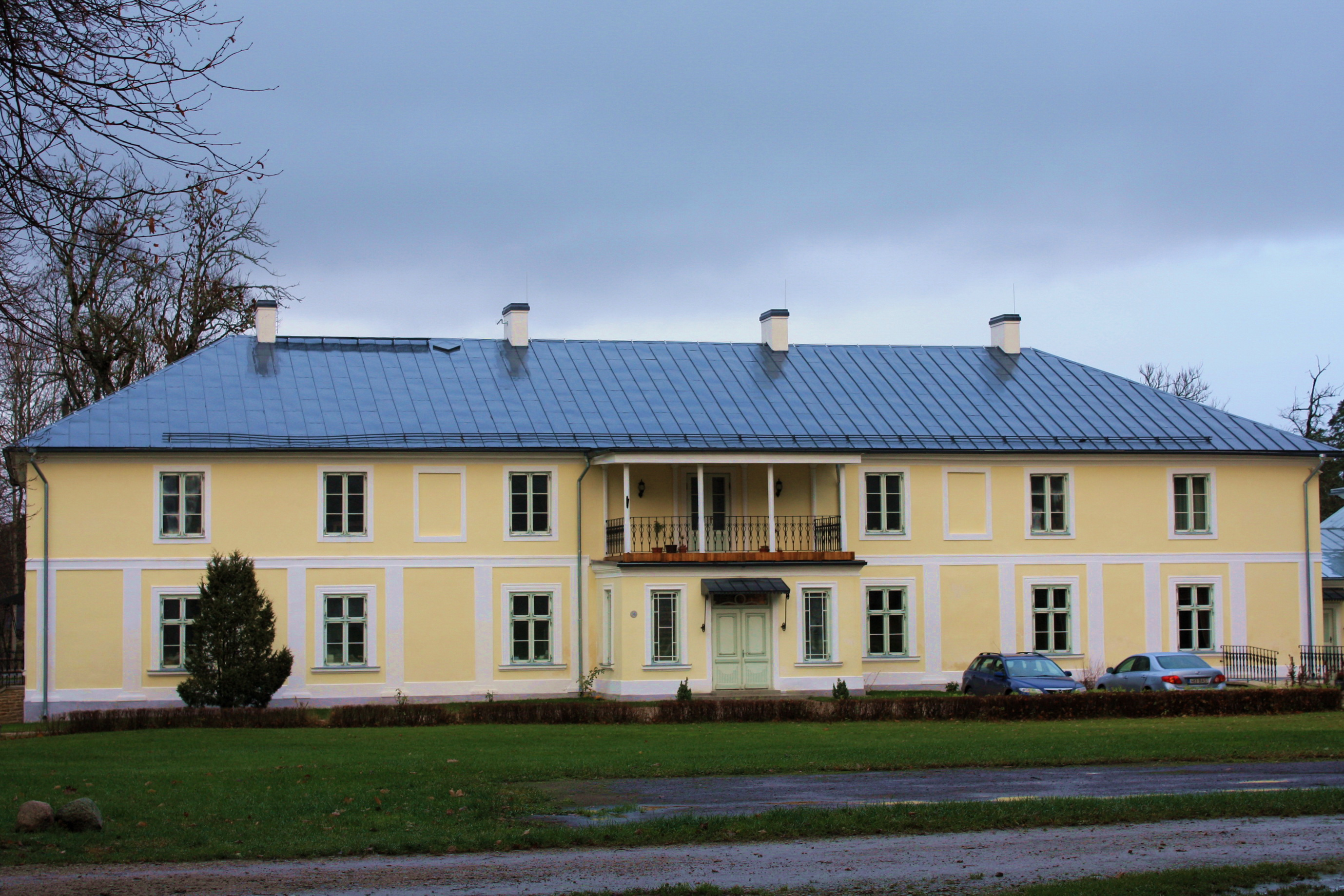
Padise Manor

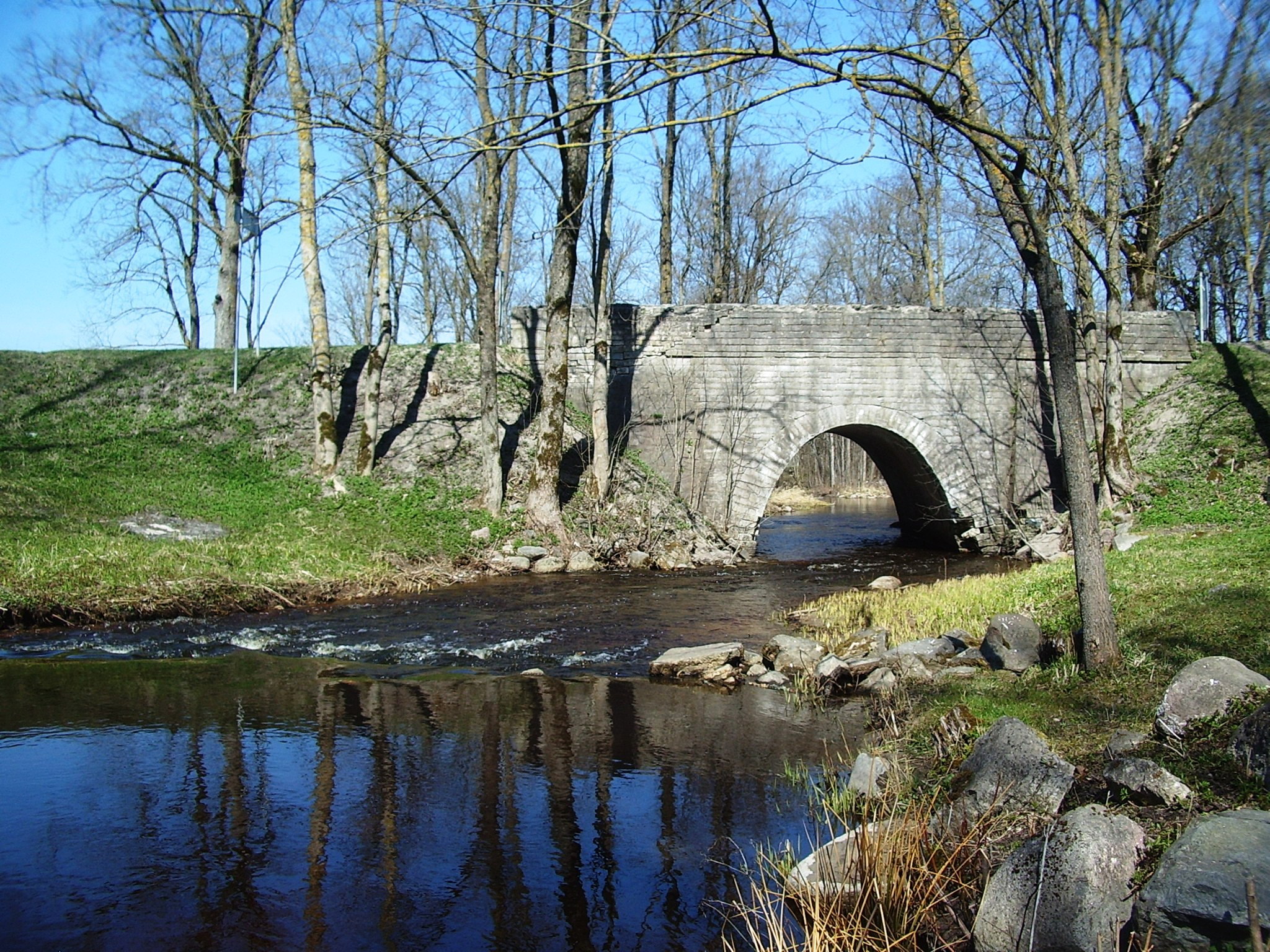
Kloostri river
