= Pae, Lääne-Harju Parish =

Village in Estonia

Coordinates: 59°12′29″N 24°00′42″E

Pae
- Village
- Interactive map of Pae
- Country: Estonia
- County: Harju County
- Parish: Lääne-Harju Parish
- Time zone: UTC+2 (EET)
  - Summer (DST): UTC+3 (EEST)

Pae is a village in Lääne-Harju Parish, Harju County in northern Estonia. The population was 105 as of 2011.
