= Ämari =

Borough in Estonia

- Small borough
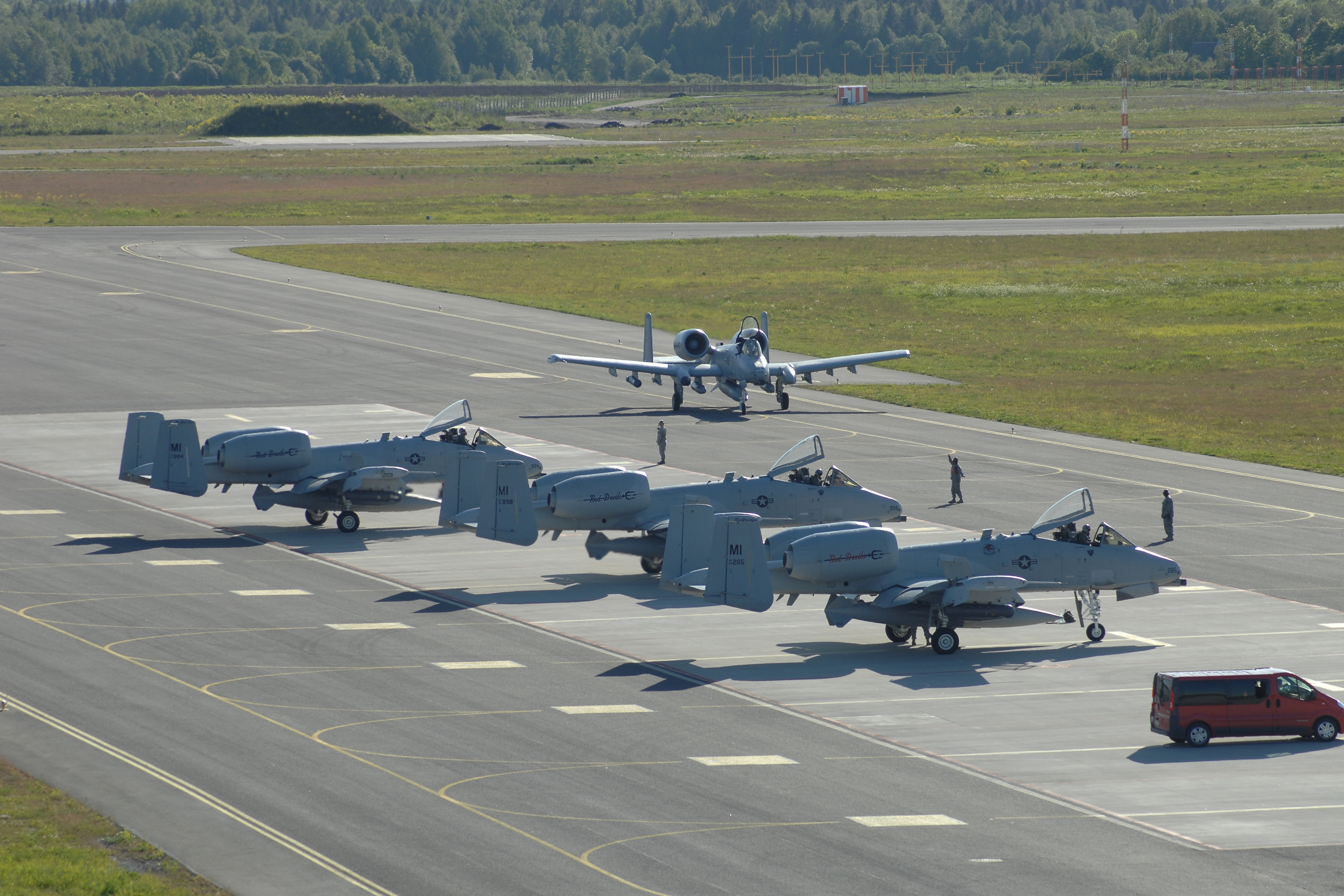
- Ämari Air Base

- Location in Estonia
- Coordinates: 59°16′01″N 24°12′58″E
- Country: Estonia
- County: Harju County
- Municipality: Lääne-Harju Parish

Population (2011 Census)
  - Total: 542

Ämari is a small borough (Estonian: alevik) in Lääne-Harju Parish, Harju County, northern Estonia. As of the 2011 census, the settlement's population was 542, of whom 190 (35.1%) were Estonians.

== See also ==
- Ämari Air Base
