= Langa, Estonia =

Village in Estonia

Langa
- Village
- Location within Estonia
- Coordinates: 59.298611°N 24.175°E
- Country: Estonia
- County: Harju County
- Parish: Lääne-Harju Parish
- Time zone: UTC+2 (EET)
  - Summer (DST): UTC+3 (EEST)

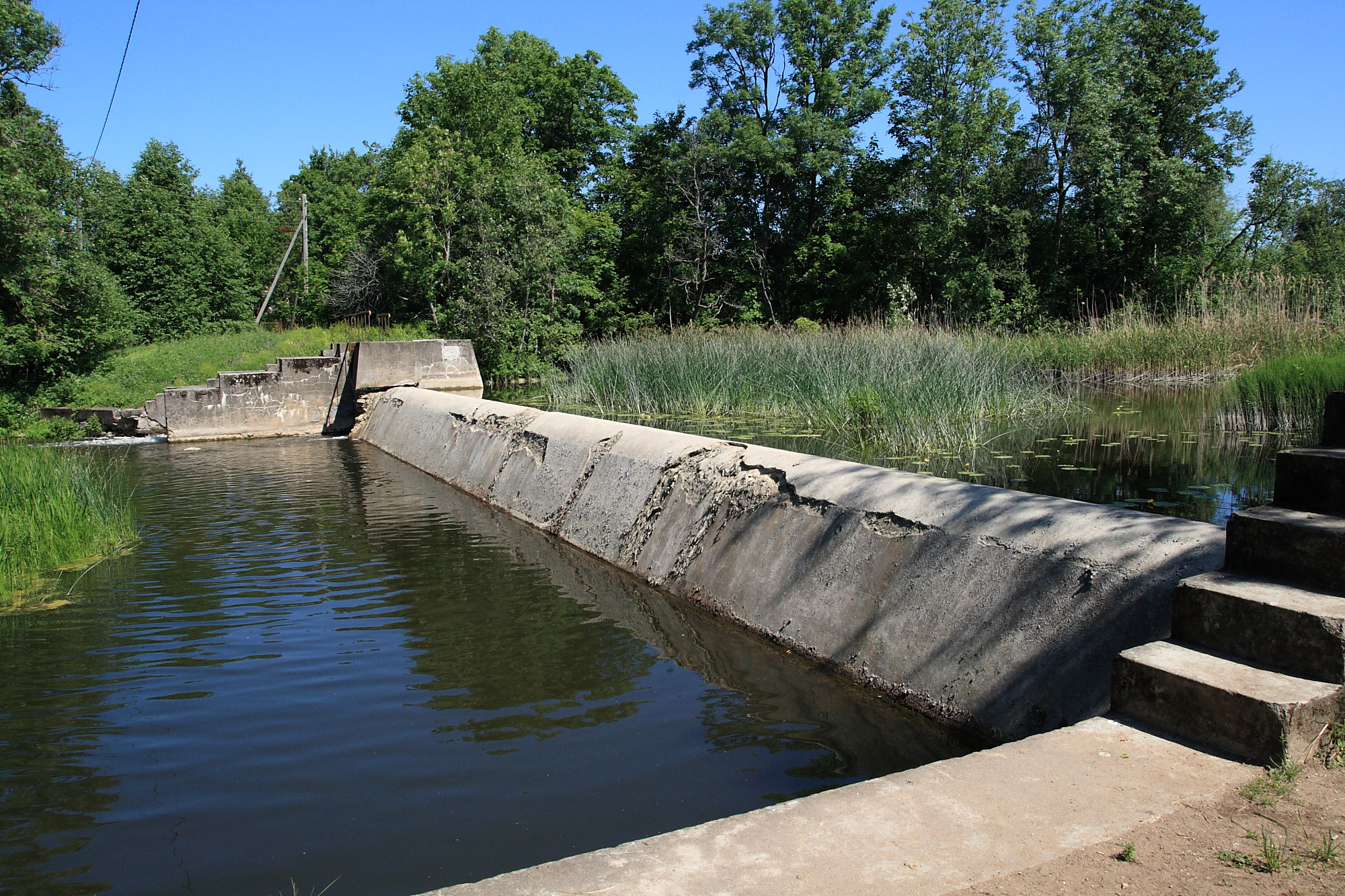

Langa is a village in Lääne-Harju Parish, Harju County in northern Estonia.
