= Julius Aamisepp =

Estonian horticulturalist

Julius Aamisepp (1 September 1883 Karilepa, Harju County – 19 January 1950 Jõgeva) was an Estonian horticulturalist, agricultural scientist, revolutionary, and soldier.

== Biography ==
Aamisepp was born in 1883 in Harju County. Upon graduation from elementary school, Aamisepp's education became militarily focused, with Aamisepp being set on joining the Imperial Russian Army. After graduating from secondary school in 1903, Aamisepp enrolled in a military electrical engineering school in St. Petersburg. While in St. Petersburg, Aamisepp became involved with a revolutionary movement inside Russia. He was expelled from the academy he was attending and briefly imprisoned, but was later allowed to return to military service on the condition that he remain under surveillance.

Rather than remain in the military, Aamisepp chose instead to return to Estonia to study horticulture; he soon developed a hobby of growing potatoes, which he cultivated near his family's home. He experimented on the Imperator variety of potato, eventually leading to him developing his own variety. Dubbed the "Kalevipoeg", the new potato variety yielded a crop 58% larger than the Imperator. When the First World War broke out in 1914, Aamisepp rejoined the Imperial Army and was commissioned as an artillery officer. When the October Revolution resulted in the collapse of the Russian state, Amisepp joined the burgeoning Estonian Independence movement, helping to organize new army units.

Following the end of the First World War, Aamisepp began working at the Jõgeva Plant Breeding Institute to develop new varieties of potatoes. Notably, Amisepp developed the Jõgeva Yellow, a popular variety of potato in Estonia. In addition to developing the Jõgeva Yellow, Aamisepp bred apples, peas, beans, beetroot, buckwheat, onions, currants, and pears.

He died in Jõgeva in 1950.
