= Kurkse Strait =

Strait located between Pakri Islands and Continental Estonia

Coordinates: 59°17′34″N 23°58′43″E

Kurkse Strait (Estonian: Kurkse väin, Swedish: Västersundet) is a strait in Estonia, located between Pakri Islands and Continental Estonia; this strait is part of Gulf of Finland.

Strait's width is about 2 km and depth is 1,5–2 m.

Vihterpalu River flows into the strait.

On 11 September 1997 took place accident (Kurkse tragedy), when Estonian soldiers tried to walk through the strait. 14 soldiers drowned.
