= Pedase =

Village in Estonia

Coordinates: 59°16′N 23°54′E

- Village
- Interactive map of Pedase
- Country: Estonia
- County: Harju County
- Parish: Lääne-Harju Parish
- Time zone: UTC+2 (EET)
  - Summer (DST): UTC+3 (EEST)

Pedase is a village in Lääne-Harju Parish, Harju County in northern Estonia.
