= Hatu =

Village in Estonia

- Village
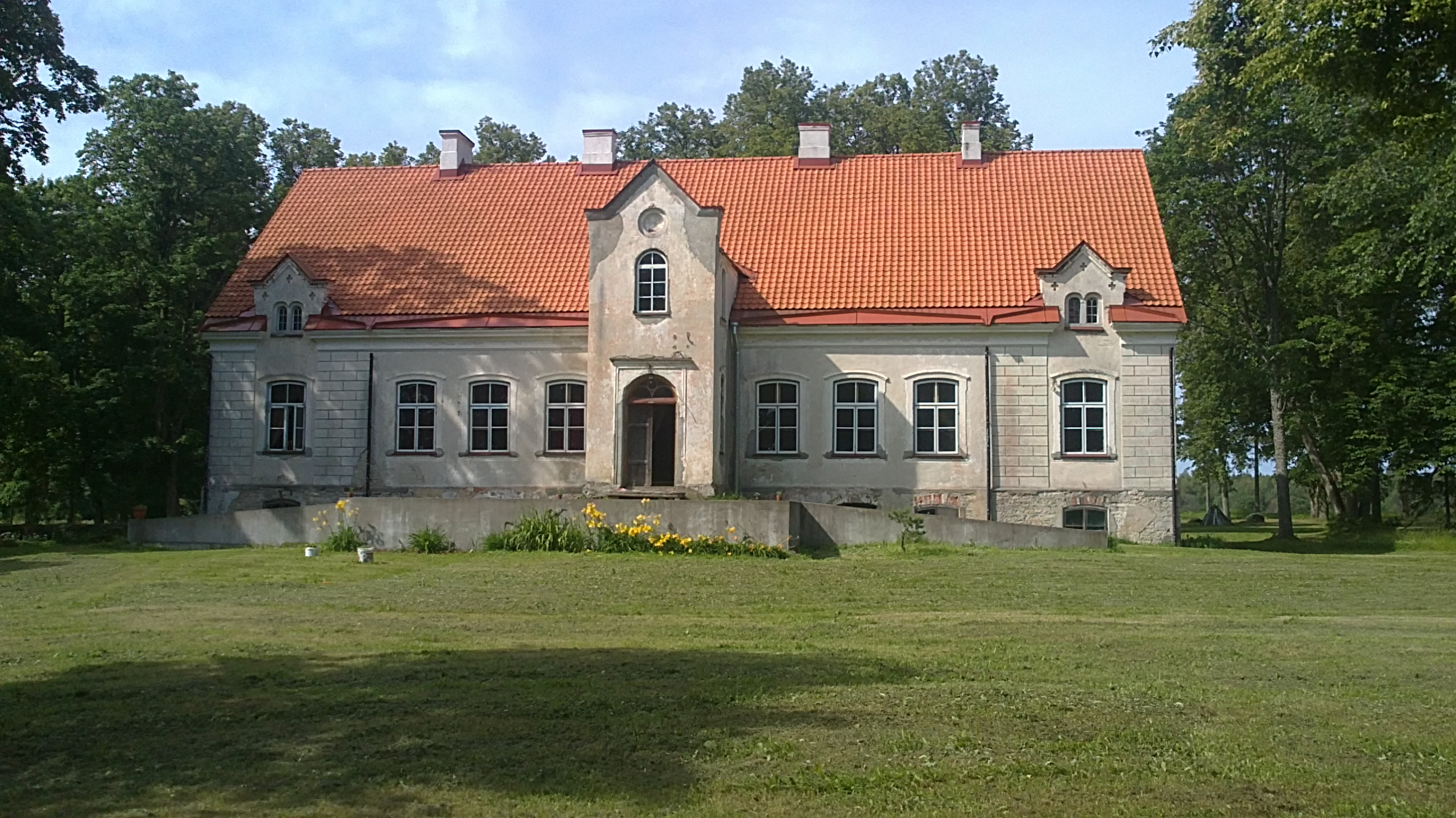
- Hatu Manor

- Location in Estonia
- Coordinates: 59°12′N 23°56′E
- Country: Estonia
- County: Harju County
- Parish: Lääne-Harju Parish
- Time zone: UTC+2 (EET)
  - Summer (DST): UTC+3 (EEST)

Hatu is a village in Lääne-Harju Parish, Harju County in northern Estonia.

== Hatu Manor ==
The manorial estate of Hatu (German: Hattoküll) dates from 1609, but the main building which can be seen today is much later, built only in 1864. It is constructed in an eclectic style and contains some original features in neo-Gothic and classical style, such as cocklestoves and doors. The property belonged to the Baltic German families of Mohrenschildt and Ramm. The last owner before the Estonian Declaration of Independence and the ensuing land reforms was Fridolf Gustav-Adolf von Ramm.
