= Arved Viirlaid =

Estonian-Canadian writer

Arved Viirlaid (April 11, 1922 – June 21, 2015) was an Estonian-Canadian writer.

Viirlaid was born in Padise, Harju County, Estonia.

Arved Viirlaid fought in the Estonian regiment in Finland during the Second World War, returning to Estonia in 1944.

He escaped from Soviet-occupied Estonia, settling first in the United Kingdom, and then moving to Canada in 1953.

Viirlaid published 9 novels and several collections of poetry. His first novel, Tormiaasta (The Year of Storms), was published in 1949. In 1952, he published Ristideta hauad (Graves Without Crosses), which was translated from Estonian into seven other languages. The English translation appeared in 1972, with a preface by John Diefenbaker. His 1965 novel, Sadu jõkke (Rain for the River) has also been translated into English.

He was awarded the Order of the National Coat of Arms, 3rd Class, by the President of Estonia in 1997.
