= Vihterpalu (river) =

River in Estonia

Vihterpalu River

Location
- Country: Estonia

Physical characteristics
- Mouth: Kurkse Strait
  - coordinates: 59°16′14″N 23°53′02″E
- Length: 54.1 km (33.6 mi)
- Basin size: 481.1 km^{2} (185.8 sq mi)

Vihterpalu River is a river in Harju and Lääne County, Estonia. The river is 54.1 km long and basin size is 481.1 km^{2}. It runs into Kurkse Strait.

Trout and grayling live in the river.
