= Padise Abbey =

Monastery in Estonia

Coordinates: 59°13′27.01″N 24°8′41.46″E

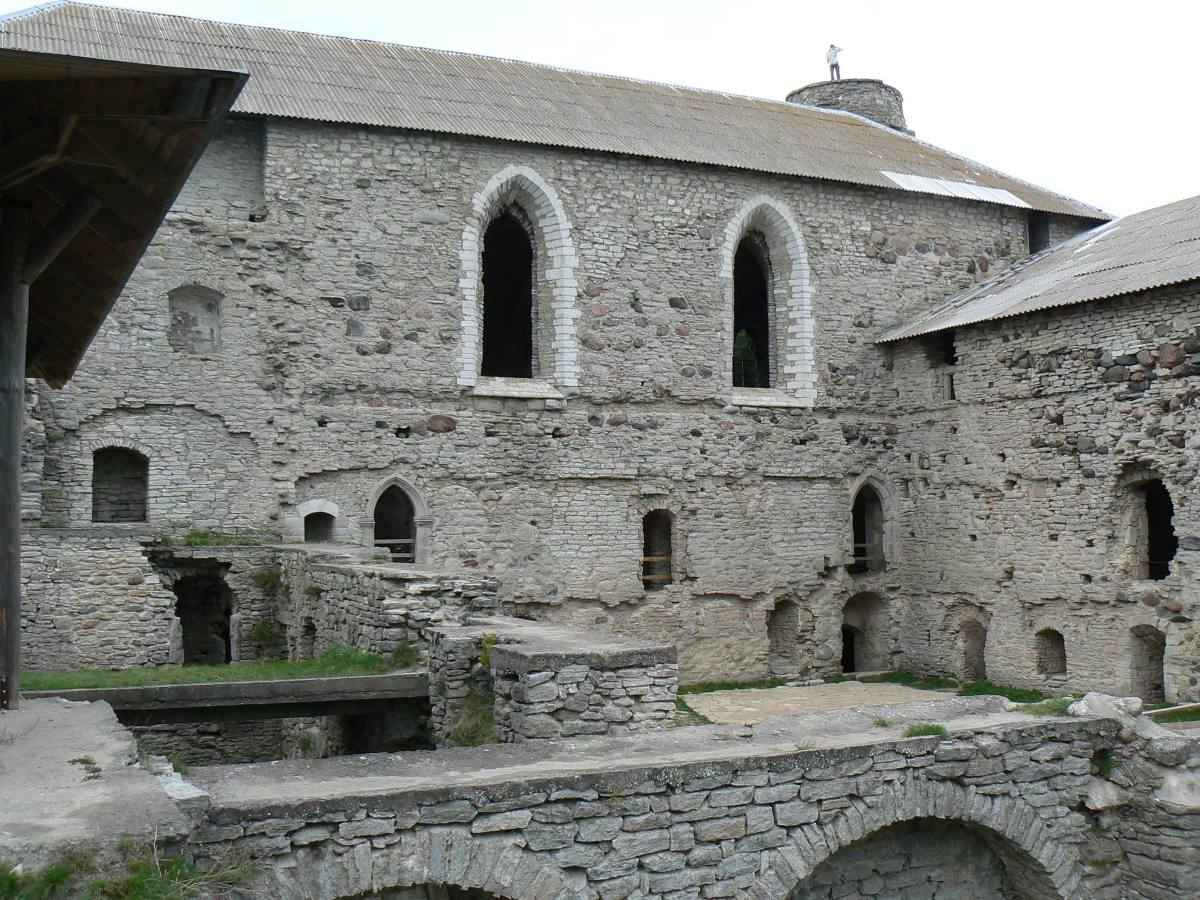
Padise Abbey

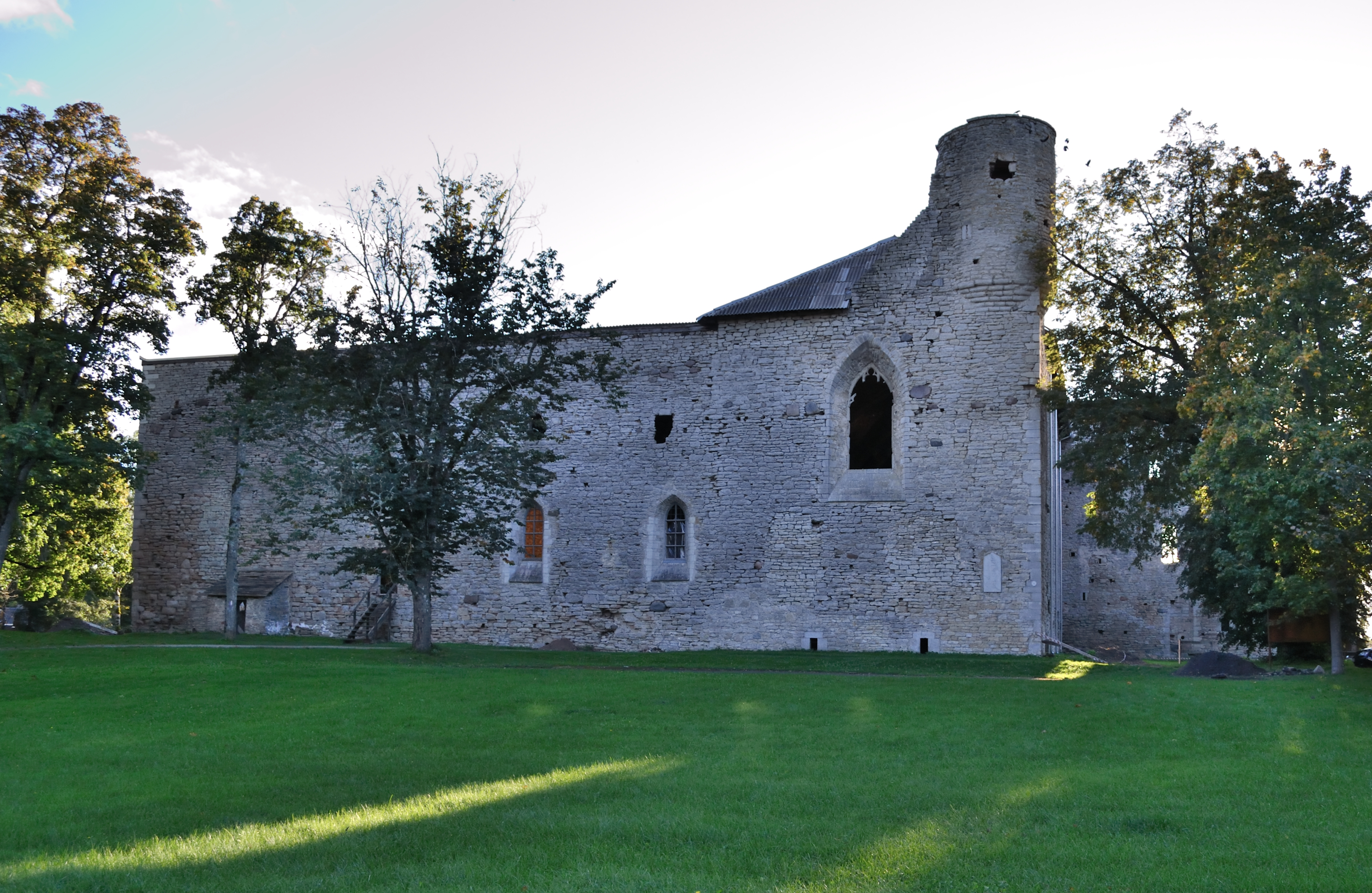

Padise Abbey (Estonian: Padise klooster) was a former Cistercian monastery in Padise in Harju County, Estonia, settled in 1310 by the dispossessed monks of Dünamünde Abbey in Latvia. It was converted into a fortress after its dissolution in 1559 and later used as a country house until 1766. The ruins have now been partially restored and made into a museum.

== History ==
The interest in Padise of monks from Dünamünde Abbey in the present Daugavgrīva near Riga is first documented in 1283 in a letter from King Eric V of Denmark (Eric Klipping) regarding the acquisition of land for the construction of a Cistercian monastery, but almost certainly they had had a presence there for several decades previously as a part of the Christianisation of the territories of Estonia newly conquered by the Teutonic Knights. In 1305 Dünamünde Abbey was appropriated by the Teutonic Knights and the monks dispossessed. King Eric VI of Denmark then gave them permission to build a fortified monastery in Padise, where they moved in 1310, although construction of the stone buildings did not begin until 1317. The new monastery was made subordinate to Stolpe Abbey in Pomerania in 1319.

By 1343, at the time of the St. George's Night Uprising, when it was still only partly built, the monastery was burnt down and 28 monks, lay brothers and German vassals were killed. Rebuilding began only after 1370. By 1445 all major works, including the construction of the gatehouse and the residential and service buildings, had been completed, and vaulting had been added to the church roof. The consecration of the main building took place in 1448.

By about 1400 the monastery had acquired extensive estates in Estonia and also in southern Finland and throughout the 15th century enjoyed a period of great prosperity and influence as one of the most important spiritual centres of Estonia. From about 1500 however it began to sell off its lands and entered a period of decline. Nevertheless, it survived the upheavals of the Reformation in the 1520s.

However, in the Livonian War, the last Master of the Livonian Order, Gotthard Kettler, fearing after the invasion of the Russians that the Swedes would occupy the monastery, occupied it himself in 1558, and in 1559 dissolved it, ejecting the monks and confiscating the buildings and estates. He converted the monastery itself into a fortress, which the Swedes duly took in 1561. In 1576 the Russians besieged and took it, and during their occupation strengthened the fortifications, but four years later were in their turn besieged by the returning Swedes, who regained it in 1580 after a long siege and a damaging bombardment.

In 1622 King Gustavus Adolphus of Sweden gave the estates of the former Padise Abbey to Thomas Ramm, Burgermeister of Riga, in the possession of whose family it remained until 1919. Ramm converted the premises into a Baroque country house. When in 1766 it was struck by lightning and burnt down, the Ramms used the stone to build a Neo-Classical manor house nearby.

== Present-day use ==
The remaining buildings, which were stabilised in the 1930s, are now a museum. A comprehensive restoration of the former monastery complex was agreed upon in 2001.

In May 2020, Padise Abbey reopened to visitors after renovation.

The monastery once housed the oldest church bell in Estonia, dating back to the 14th century. The bell can now be found at the Lutheran Church of the Holy Cross, located in Risti.

== List of abbots ==
- 1317?–1320 Johannes
- 1321–1326? Evert (Egbert)
- 1328 Nicolaus
- 1331 Egbert
- 1339 Johannes
- 1341–1345 Nicolaus
- 1345 Johannes
- 1346–1352 Nicolaus
- 1364–1376 Nicolaus Risebit
- 1379–1388 Bertoldus
- 1392–1398 Johannes
- 1402?–1403 Kurt Kropelin
- 1407–1413? Johannes
- 1415–1418 Conradus
- 1423–1431 Tidemannus
- 1436–1438 Werner
- 1441 Michel
- 1447?–1453 Johannes Grues
- 1454 Nicolaus
- 1478 Tidemann
- 1488–1489 Johannes Vlemynck
- 1491 Georg Kone
- 1492 Hinrick Warnsbeck
- 1493–1504 Michael Sasse
- 1506 Johannes von der Heyde
- 1509–1524 Georgius Karnip
- 1524–1543 Everhardus Sunnenschin
- 1544–1553 Ludovicus Duchsheerer
- 1555–1559 Georgius Conradi

== Gallery ==
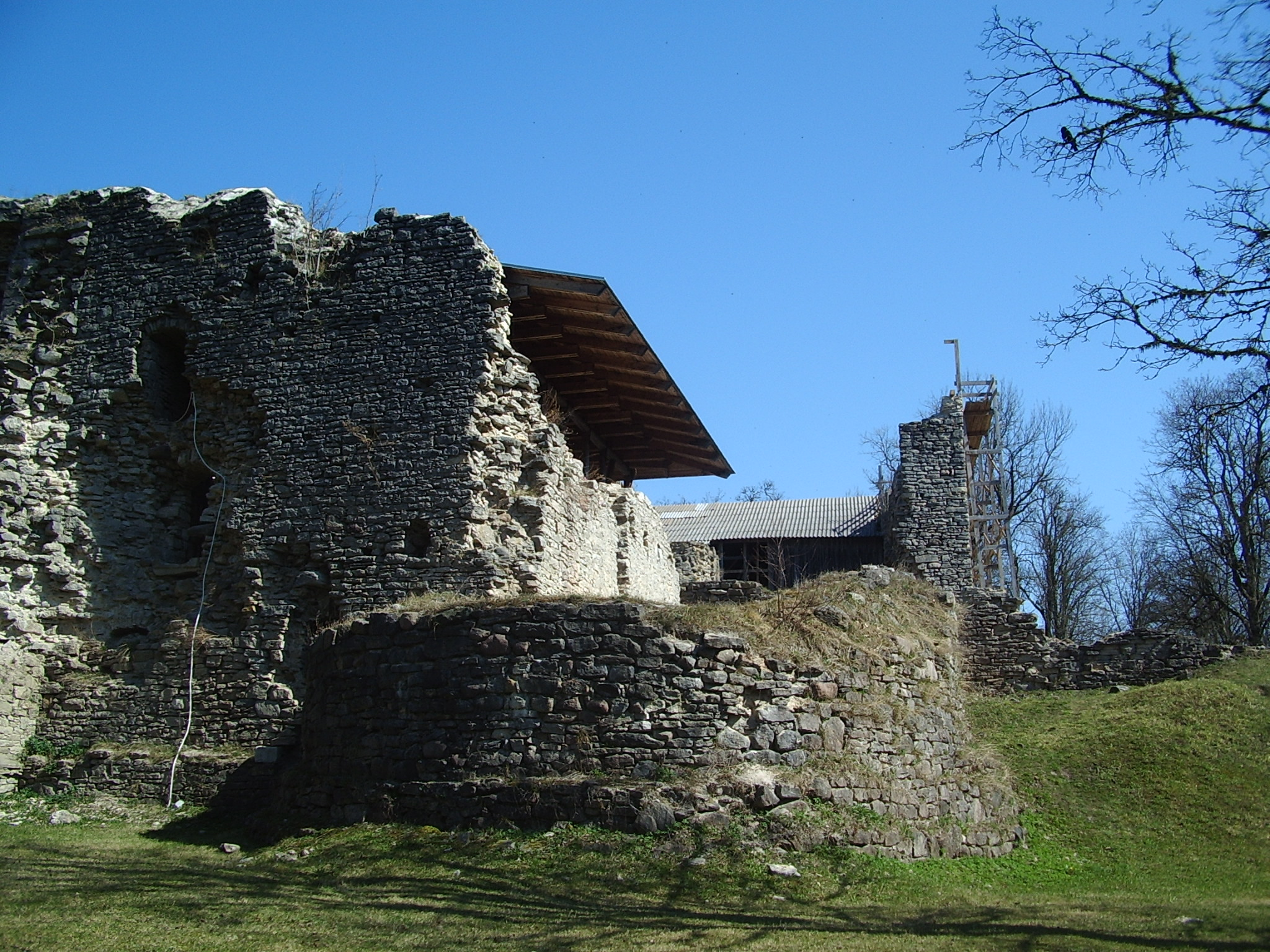
Ruins of abbey

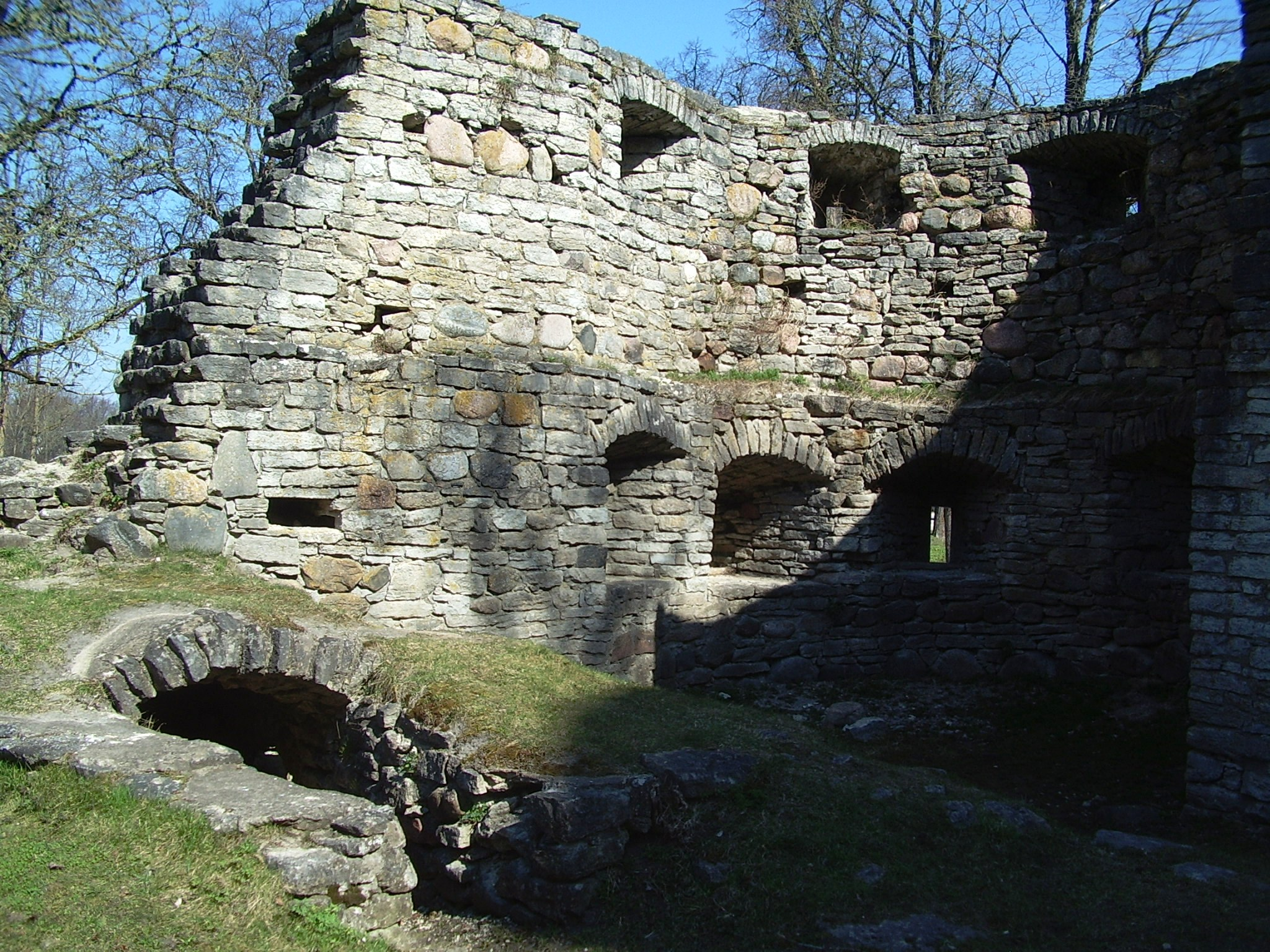
Ruins of abbey

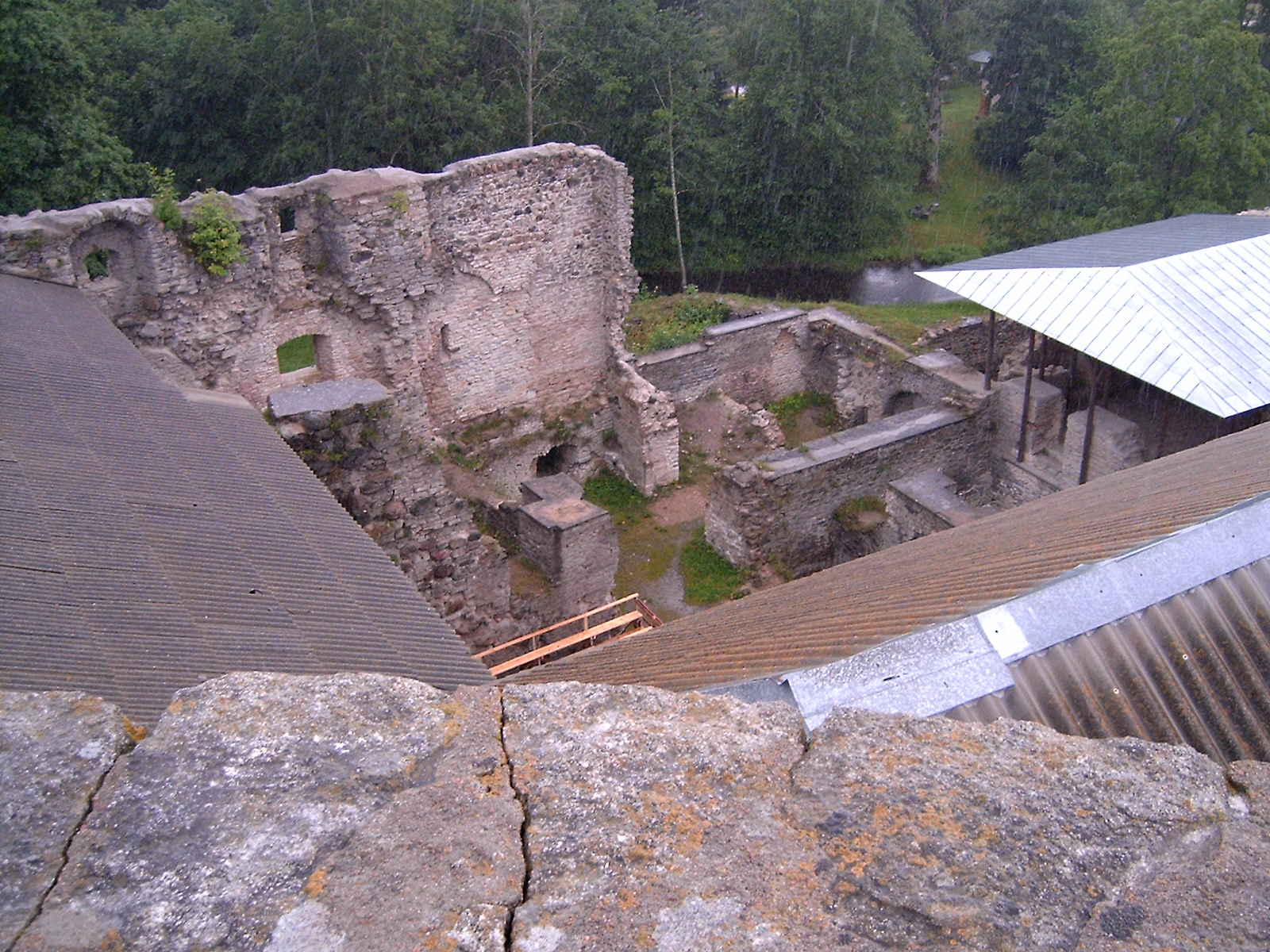
Ruins of abbey

== See also ==
- List of Christian religious houses in Estonia

== Sources and external links ==
- Website of the parish of Padise (in Estonian)
- Padise Abbey and estate (in Estonian)
- Photos of Padise Abbey
- Padise Abbey Museum
- History of Padise Abbey (in English)
- 23.04.2020 12:47, Renovation works in Padise Monastery brought interesting findings to light, err.ee
