= Vilivalla, Harju County =

Village in Estonia

Coordinates: 59°14′38″N 23°55′46″E

Vilivalla
- Village
- Interactive map of Vilivalla
- Country: Estonia
- County: Harju County
- Parish: Lääne-Harju Parish
- Time zone: UTC+2 (EET)
  - Summer (DST): UTC+3 (EEST)

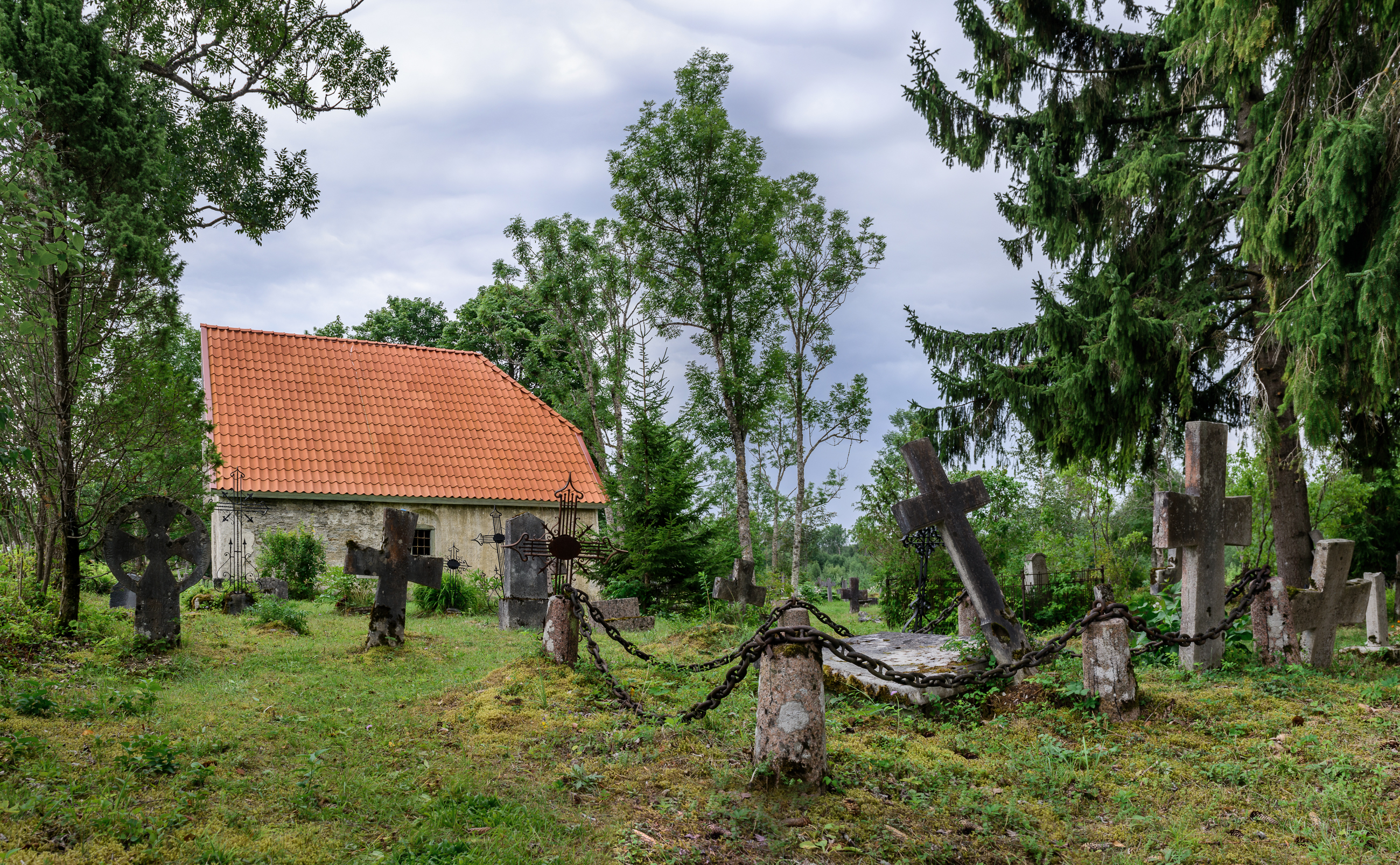
The cemetery

Vilivalla is a village in Lääne-Harju Parish, Harju County in northern Estonia.
