= Kurkse tragedy =

1997 military tragedy in Estonia

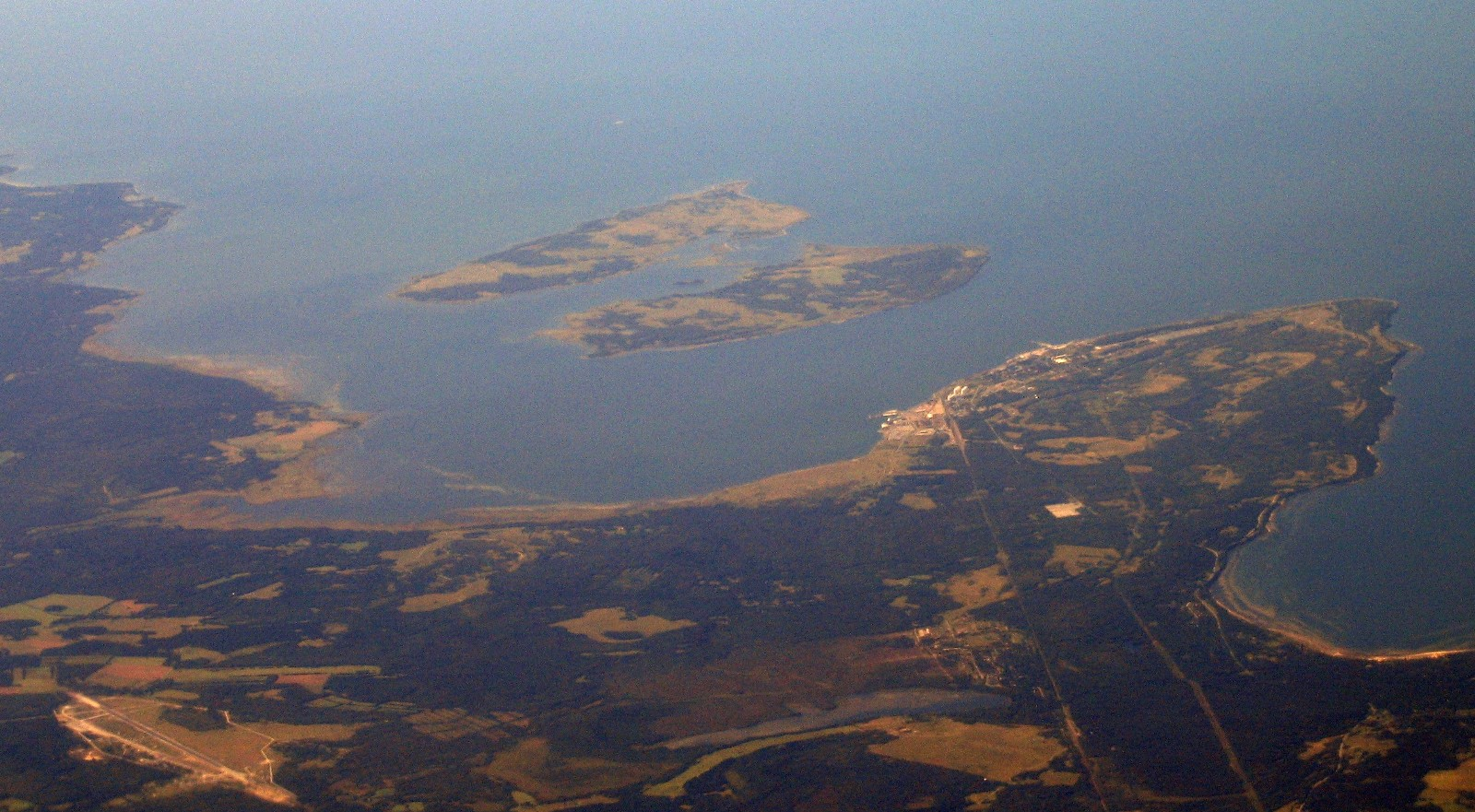
Aerial view of the Kurkse Strait (left of the center of the image) and the Pakri Islands

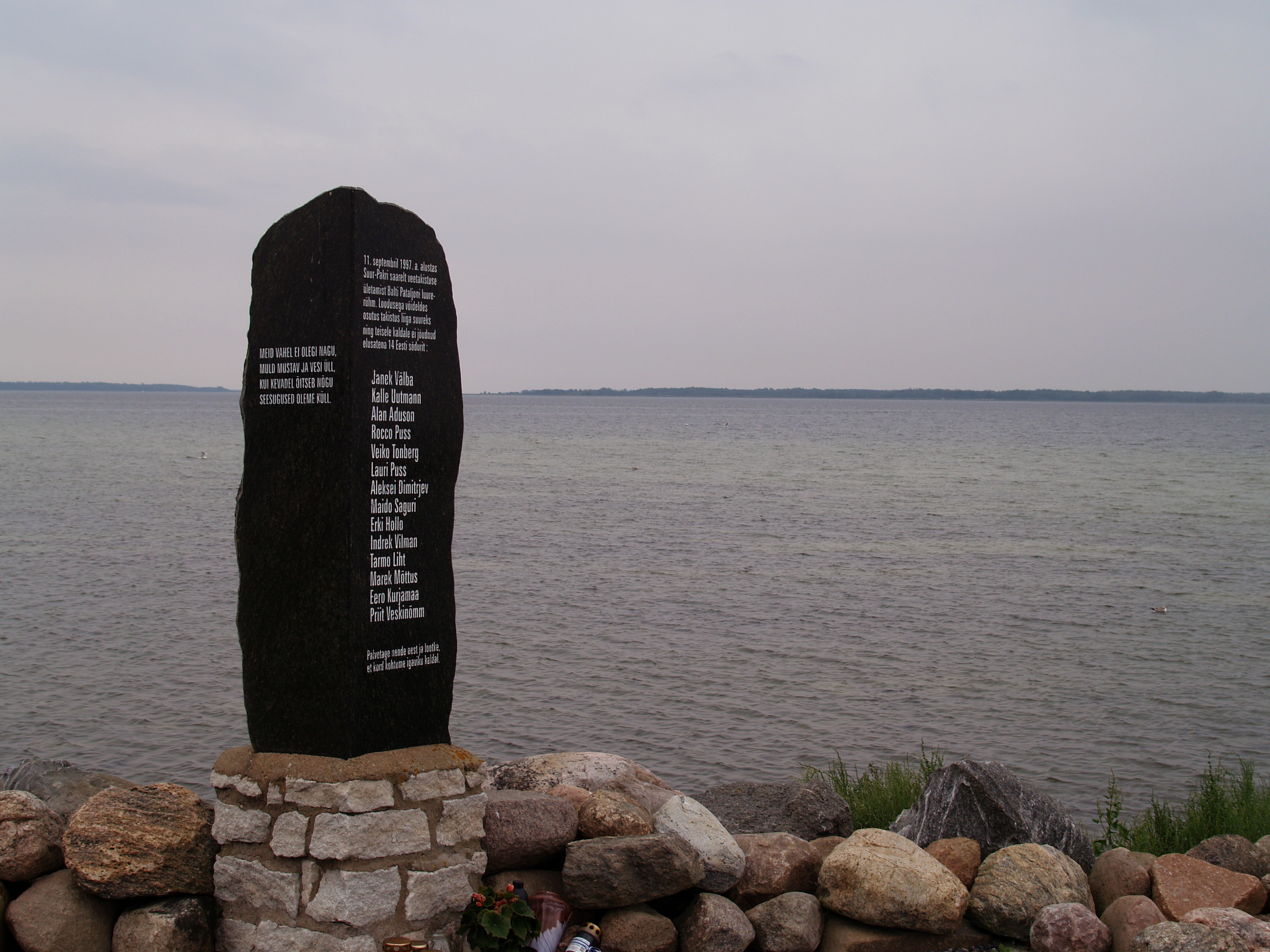
Memorial for Kurkse tragedy

The Kurkse tragedy (Estonian: Kurkse tragöödia) occurred on 11 September 1997, when 14 Estonian soldiers of the Baltic Battalion drowned in the Kurkse Strait during a dangerous training maneuver. The Kurkse tragedy is the deadliest accident in the Estonian Defence Forces since the country regained independence in 1991.

== Accident ==
As the last part of an exercise which had lasted several days, a team of 22 soldiers from the reconnaissance unit of the Baltic Peacekeeping Battalion attempted to wade about 3 km (2 mi) from the Pakri Islands through the shallow Kurkse Strait to the Estonian mainland. Although in the beginning of the exercise the conditions seemed satisfactory, later during the crossing, when the unit came out of the lee of the island, high winds and waves appeared and several men started to suffer from hypothermia in the cool (14°C) water. Also, it was expected that most of the strait could be waded through and it would be needed to swim for only several hundred meters, but instead the men had to start swimming relatively early and couldn't ever touch seabed before they were rescued. The eight surviving soldiers were rescued by the master of the nearby Kurkse harbour.

The commander of the unit, Jaanus Karm, was later found guilty of negligence for leading his troops into such dangerous circumstances. He was sentenced to four and a half years in prison, but was pardoned by the president Lennart Meri.

In September 1998, a memorial stone was erected in the port of Kurkse in memory of those who died in the accident. In 2008, the Kurkse tragedy was the subject of the Estonian documentary film Surmaretk.

== See also ==
- Ribbon Creek incident
