= Suurküla, Harju County =

Village in Estonia

Coordinates: 59°15′38″N 24°10′54″E

Suurküla
- Village
- Interactive map of Suurküla
- Country: Estonia
- County: Harju County
- Parish: Lääne-Harju Parish
- Time zone: UTC+2 (EET)
  - Summer (DST): UTC+3 (EEST)

Suurküla is a village in Lääne-Harju Parish, Harju County, in northern Estonia.
