= Kurkse =

Village in Estonia

Coordinates: 59°17′N 24°02′E

- Village
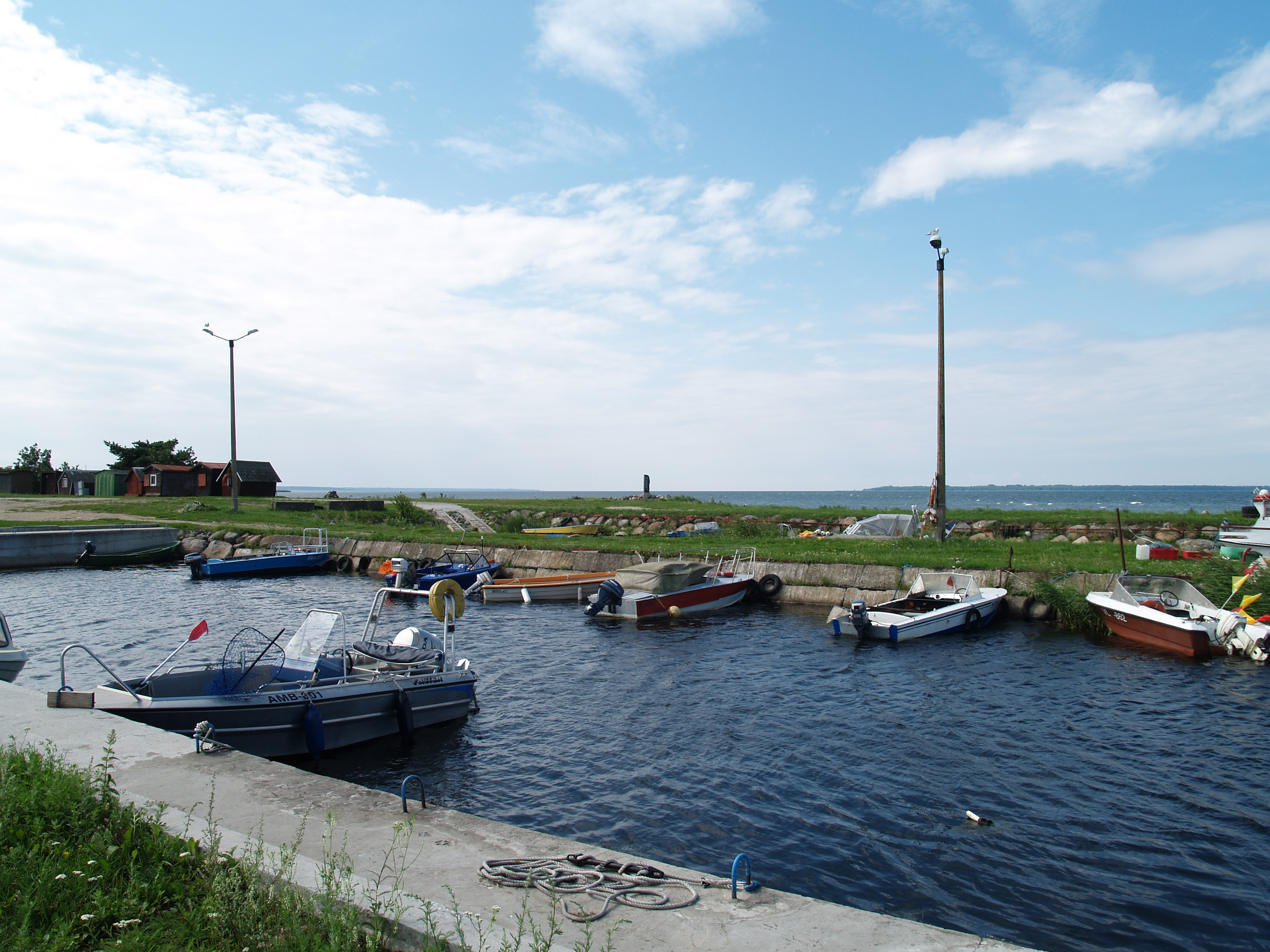
- Kurkse harbour
- Interactive map of Kurkse
- Country: Estonia
- County: Harju County
- Parish: Lääne-Harju Parish
- Time zone: UTC+2 (EET)
  - Summer (DST): UTC+3 (EEST)

Kurkse is a village in Lääne-Harju Parish, Harju County in northern Estonia.

== Pictures ==
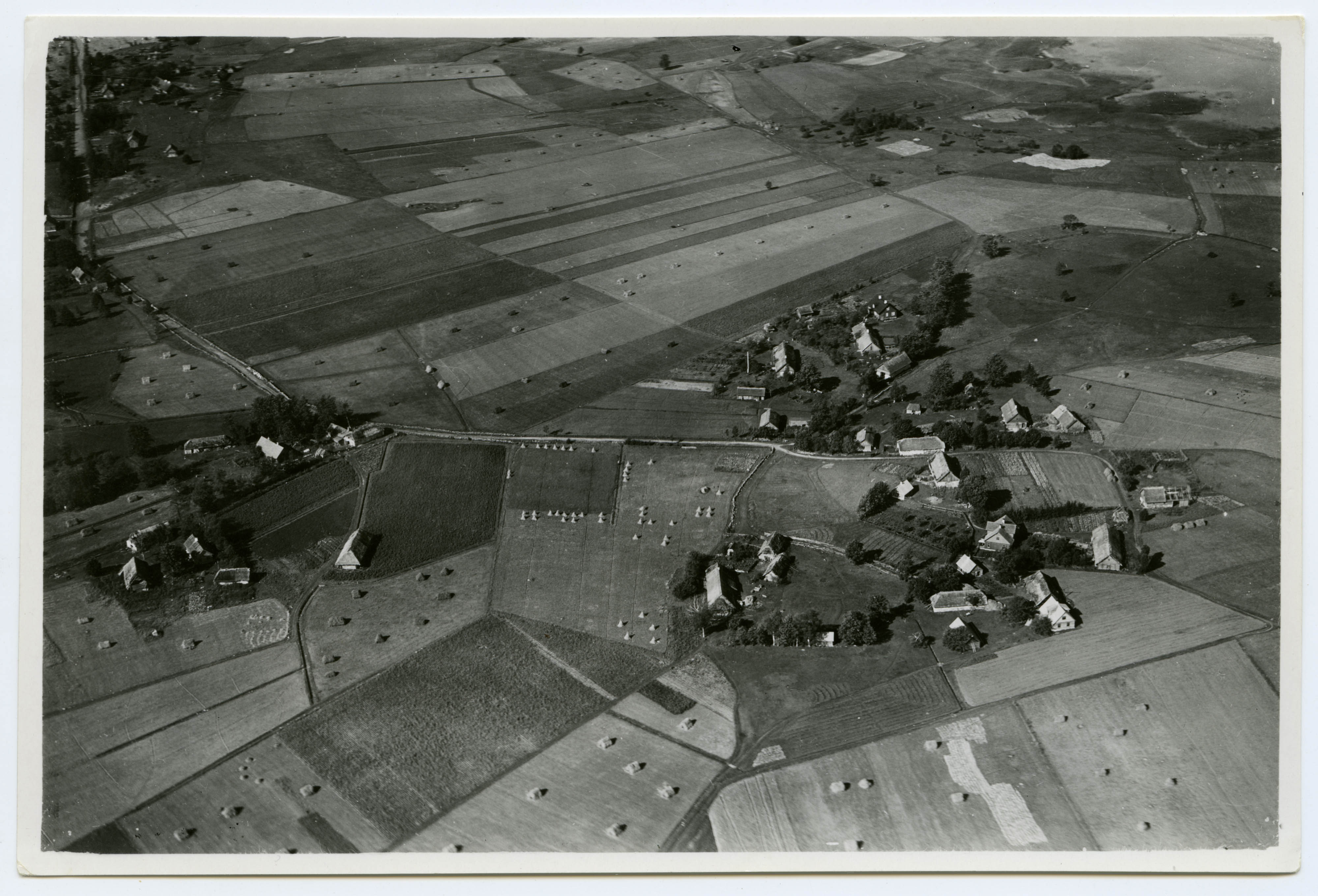
Kurkse küla (Korkis) in 1934

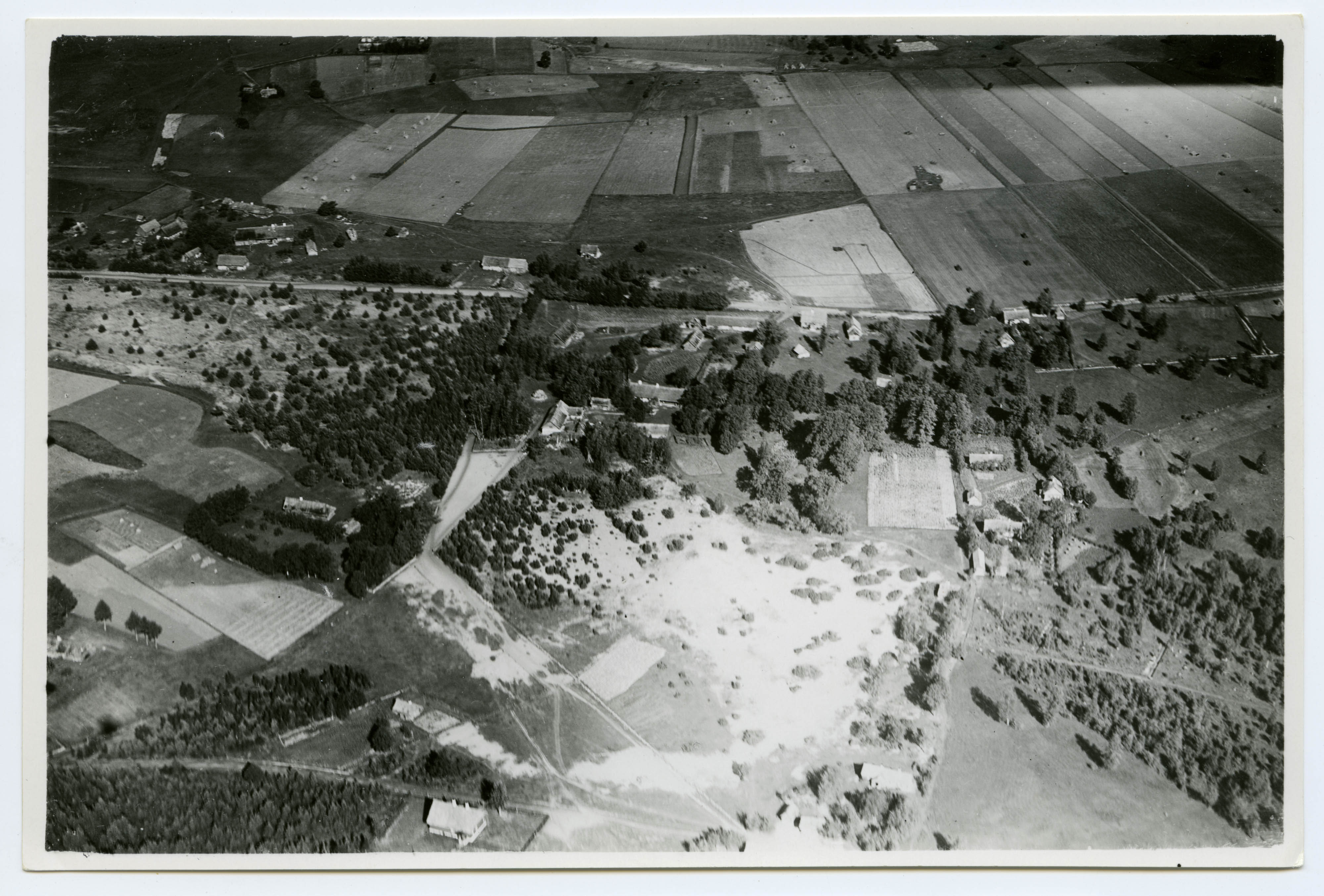
Kurkse küla (Korkis) in 1934

== See also ==
- Kurkse tragedy
