= Pala accident =

1996 bus accident in Estonia

- Location of Jõgeva County in Estonia

Details
- Date: 11 October 1996
- Location: Jõgeva County
- Coordinates: 58°38′04″N 26°56′57″E
- Country: Estonia

Statistics
- Passengers: 37
- Deaths: 8
- Injured: 29

The Pala accident (Estonian: Pala õnnetus) was a fatal traffic incident involving a school bus on 11 October 1996 in Jõgeva County, Estonia. The bus was carrying 35 students of the Pala Comprehensive School and 2 adults; 8 people died.

The PAZ school bus met a Scania wood truck at the 3rd kilometre of Sõõru–Nõva road, a narrow unpaved road. Having noticed each other, the drivers chose different strategies: the school bus driver, driving at a low speed, kept to the right side of the road in order to give the truck more space to pass; the truck, driving at about 70–80 km/h, began the manoeuvre by braking heavily. On the unpaved road, braking led to cross-road oscillation of the truck, leading the truck driver to worry about a risk of falling off the road. The truck driver compensated by temporarily unbraking and turning sharply left—towards the axis of the road—at an unfortunate time, leading the truck to drive into the school bus at an angle of about 30 degrees. In the collision, the truck "skinned" off the school bus' left side, killing 8 students born in 1982–1986.

Emergency response was delayed due to the accident site not being covered by GSM towers at that time as well as the lower-frequency emergency response dispatch radio transmitter being relatively far from the site, leading to several ambulances passing the accident site before finding it. However, considering the nature of the deaths and injuries, medical experts believe the delays did not increase their number.

== Aftermath ==
The children who died in the accident were buried on 16 October 1996. By a special decree, the prime minister Tiit Vähi declared the day a national day of mourning.

Numerous logistical mistakes were uncovered in the handling of this accident. While experts agree that it did not increase the death toll, the cabinet of ministers convened a crisis commission on 28 October 1996 to hear evidence on incident handling.

Several survivors, including the truck driver, suffered from post-traumatic stress disorder. In the following five years, the truck driver was repeatedly hospitalised in Tartu Psychiatric Hospital; in the following ten years, his psychological state deteriorated, leading to experts repeatedly finding he was not competent to stand trial and prompting the supervising prosecutor to apply for a court order to force treatment on him shortly before the statute of limitations ran out.

Jallo Freiethal, a surviving student in the bus and 12 years old at the time of the accident, was awarded an Order of the Estonian Red Cross of the second class by president Lennart Meri on 19 February 1997 for disconnecting the school bus' batteries, thus reducing the risk of a gasoline fire.

== Sources ==
- Postimees 17 October 1996: Eile oli Eestis leinapäev by Urmas Klaas
- Luup 28 October 1996: Surmasõit by Mai Vöörmann, Maarja-Liis Arujärv and Toomas Sildam
- Luup 14 April 1997: Pärast Pala katastroofi by Mai Vöörmann
- SL Õhtuleht 11 October 2001: Meie elamata elu on kusagil olemas by Tarmo Michelson
- Postimees 24 November 2004: Arstid ei luba Pala avarii põhjustajat kohtu ette
- Puutepunkt March 2006: Pala bussiõnnetus – kümme aastat hiljem by Tiina Kangro
- Postimees 30 May 2009: Eesti raskeimad liiklusõnnetused jäävad ajalukku
