= Bengt Gottfried Forselius =

Estonian writer (1660–1688)

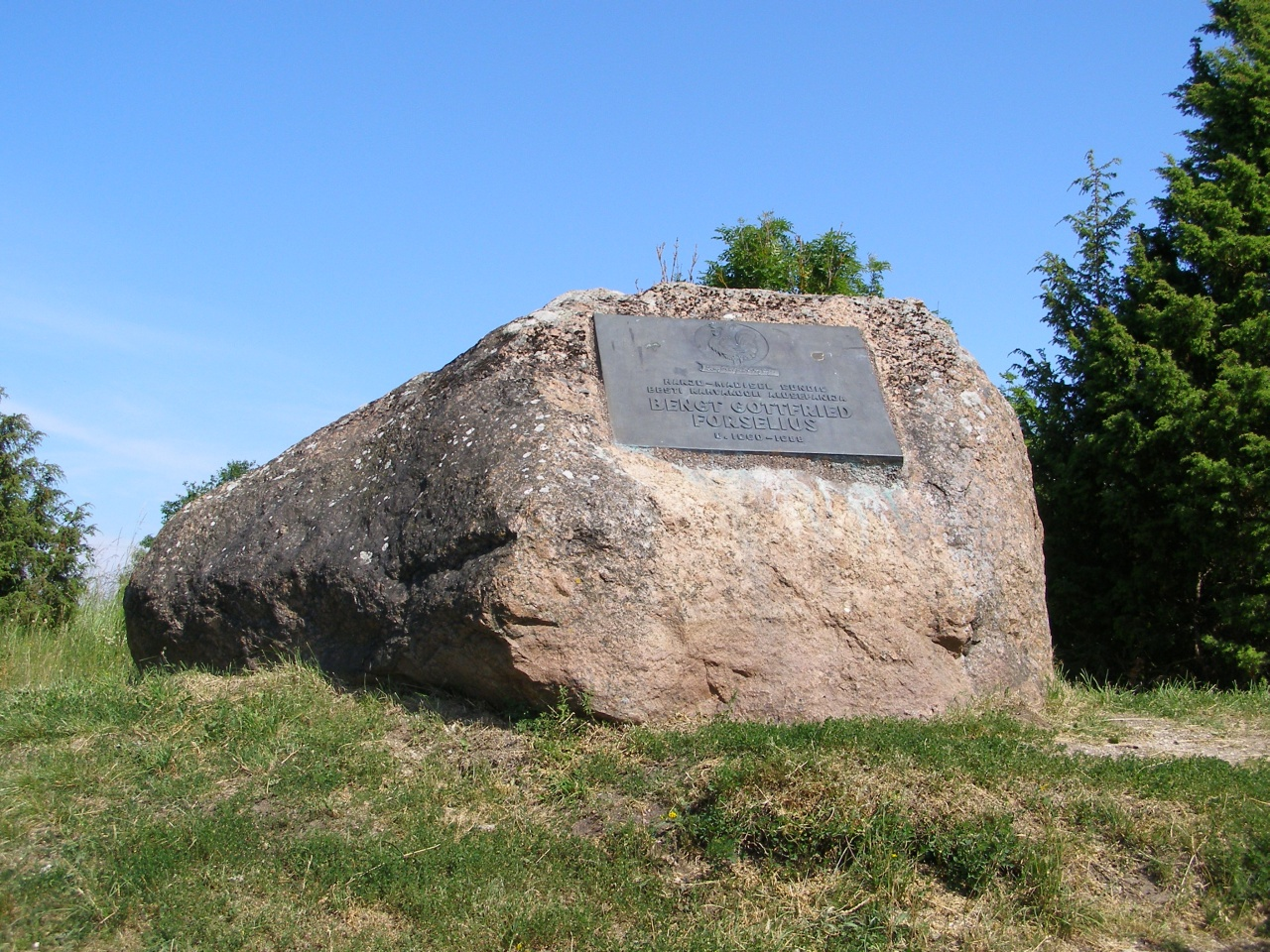
Memorial stone for Bengt Gottfried Forselius in his birthplace, Harju-Madise

Bengt Gottfried Forselius (c. 1660, Harju-Madise, Harju County, Swedish Estonia – November 16, 1688, Baltic Sea) was a founder of public education in Estonia, author of the first ABC-book in the Estonian language, and creator of a spelling system which made the teaching and learning of Estonian easier. Forselius and Johann Hornung were mainly responsible for making a start at reforming the Estonian literary language in the late 17th century. Some German constructions were abandoned, and a strict spelling system was adopted which still relied on German orthography.

Forselius was a Swede born in Estonia. His father, pastor Johann Forselius was originally a Swede from Finland, thus the Swedish family was familiar with Finnic languages. Forselius spoke good Estonian as well as Swedish and German. He received his first education at the Tallinn (Reval) Gymnasium and then graduated with a law degree from the University of Wittenberg in Germany.

In 1684, after returning to Estonia, Forselius founded the first teachers' college (Forselius Seminar), to teach Estonian schoolteachers and parish clerks, in Piiskopi manor (Bishop's Manor) near Tartu (Dorpat). The course there lasted for two years, with emphasis on fluent reading, religion instruction, German, arithmetic and bookbinding. Forselius introduced a new method of teaching whereby, instead of remaining passive, during lessons one student read aloud while the others followed. In 1686, an ABC-book devised by him was introduced into use in Estonian schools.

Many local Baltic German aristocrats at the time disliked Forselius' idea of encouraging peasants to aspire to education and complained that pupils of the schools were taken by the Swedish army or that school fees were expensive. Forselius countered this by taking two of his best pupils, Ignati Jaak and Pakri Hansu Jüri (Jüri, son of Hans from Pakri), from the parish of Kambja, to Stockholm, where their abilities impressed King Charles XI of Sweden.

By the time of Forselius death in 1688 he had founded 38 schools with 800 pupils in the Estonian areas of Swedish Livonia and 8 schools with 200 students in Swedish Estonia. Forselius drowned during a storm on his return from Stockholm where he had just been appointed inspector of Livonian peasant schools with the power to create as many as he saw fit. Between 1687-1695 by the order of Swedish state schools were to be established in every Estonian parish.

By 1898, 97 percent of Estonian population was literate.
