= Ferdinand Laurberg =

Estonian footballer and bandy player (1904–1941)

Ferdinand Laurberg (8 March 1904 – 9 October 1941) was an Estonian bandy player and footballer (goal keeper), born in Vihterpalu, Harju County.

His club (Tallinna Sport) was 6-times Estonian champion in bandy, and he was a member of Estonia men's national bandy team.

He played also football, and in 1929, his club won Estonian championships. He played one match for Estonia men's national football team.
