= Lääne-Harju Parish =

Municipality of Estonia

Coordinates: 59°19′00″N 24°12′00″E

Lääne-Harju Parish Lääne-Harju vald
- Municipality of Estonia
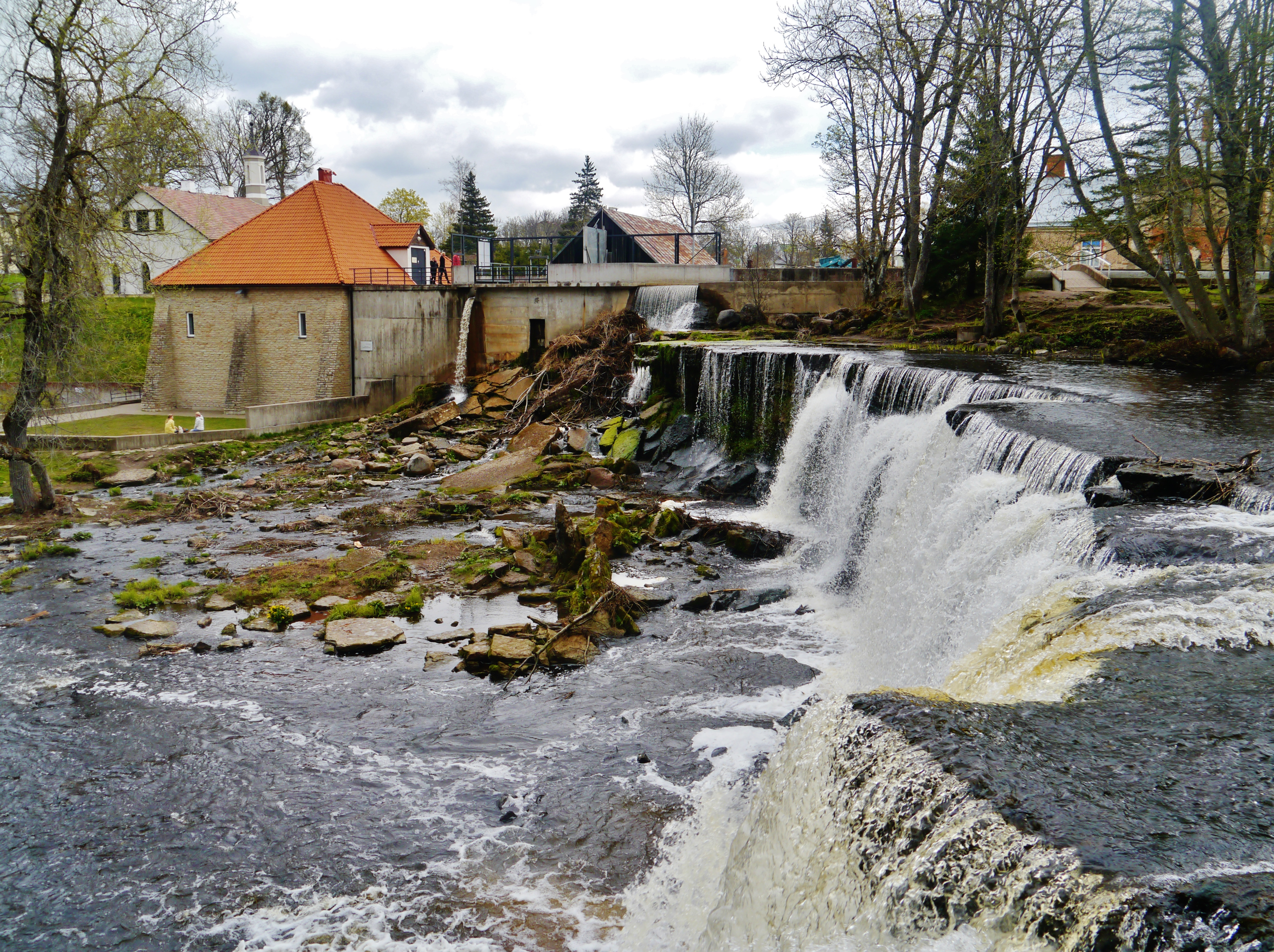
- Keila Falls at Keila-Joa

- Flag Coat of arms

- Lääne-Harju Parish within Harju County
- Country: Estonia
- County: Harju County
- Administrative centre: Paldiski

Government
  - Mayor: Jaanus Saat

Area
  - Total: 645.71 km^{2} (249.31 sq mi)

Population (2026)
  - Total: 13,754
  - Density: 21.301/km^{2} (55.168/sq mi)
- ISO 3166 code: EE-431
- Website: www.laaneharju.ee

Lääne-Harju Parish (Estonian: Lääne-Harju vald) is a rural municipality in northern Estonia. It is a part of Harju County. The municipality has a population of 13,754 (as of 1 January 2026) and covers an area of 645.71 km^{2}. The population density is 21.3/km^{2} (55.2/sq mi).

The parish was formed as a result of the administrative reform in 2017 when four municipalities – Keila Parish, Padise Parish, Vasalemma Parish and the town of Paldiski – were merged to become Lääne-Harju Parish.

The current mayor (Estonian: vallavanem) is Jaanus Saat (since the formation in 2017).

== Demographics ==
As of 1 January 2026, the parish had 13,754 residents, of which 7,156 (52.0%) were women and 6,598 (48.0%) were men.

=== Settlements ===
There are one town, six small boroughs and 46 villages in Lääne-Harju Parish.

The administrative centre of the municipality is Paldiski, a town.

The small boroughs are Ämari, Karjaküla, Keila-Joa, Klooga, Rummu and Vasalemma.

=== Religion ===
Among residents of the parish above 15 years of age, 21.0 per cent declared themselves to be Orthodox, 7.5 per cent to be Lutheran, while other Christian denominations made up 2.1 per cent of the population. The majority of residents of the parish, 67.7 per cent, were religiously unaffiliated. 1.7 per cent of the population followed other religions or did not specify their religious affiliation.

== Notable people ==
- Bengt Gottfried Forselius (c. 1660 in Harju-Madise – 1688), was a founder of public education in Estonia, author of the first ABC-book in the Estonian language, and creator of a spelling system
- Ivan Gannibal (1735 in Karjaküla – 1801), a Russian military leader and great-uncle of poet, Alexander Pushkin.
- Serge Wolkonsky (1860 in Keila-Joa – 1937), Russian theatrical worker, early Russian proponent of eurhythmics
- Konstantin Türnpu (1865 in Klooga – 1927), composer and conductor, important figure in Estonian choral music.
- Julius Aamisepp (1883 in Karilepa – 1950), horticulturalist, agricultural scientist, revolutionary and soldier.
- Ferdinand Laurberg (1904 in Vihterpalu – 1941), bandy player and football goalkeeper.
- August Neo (1908 in Vihterpalu – 1982), freestyle & Greco-Roman wrestler, won silver and bronze medals at the 1936 Summer Olympics
- Kaspar Velberg (born 1989 in Vihterpalu), stage, TV, film and voice actor.
