= Paldiski =

Town in Estonia

- Town
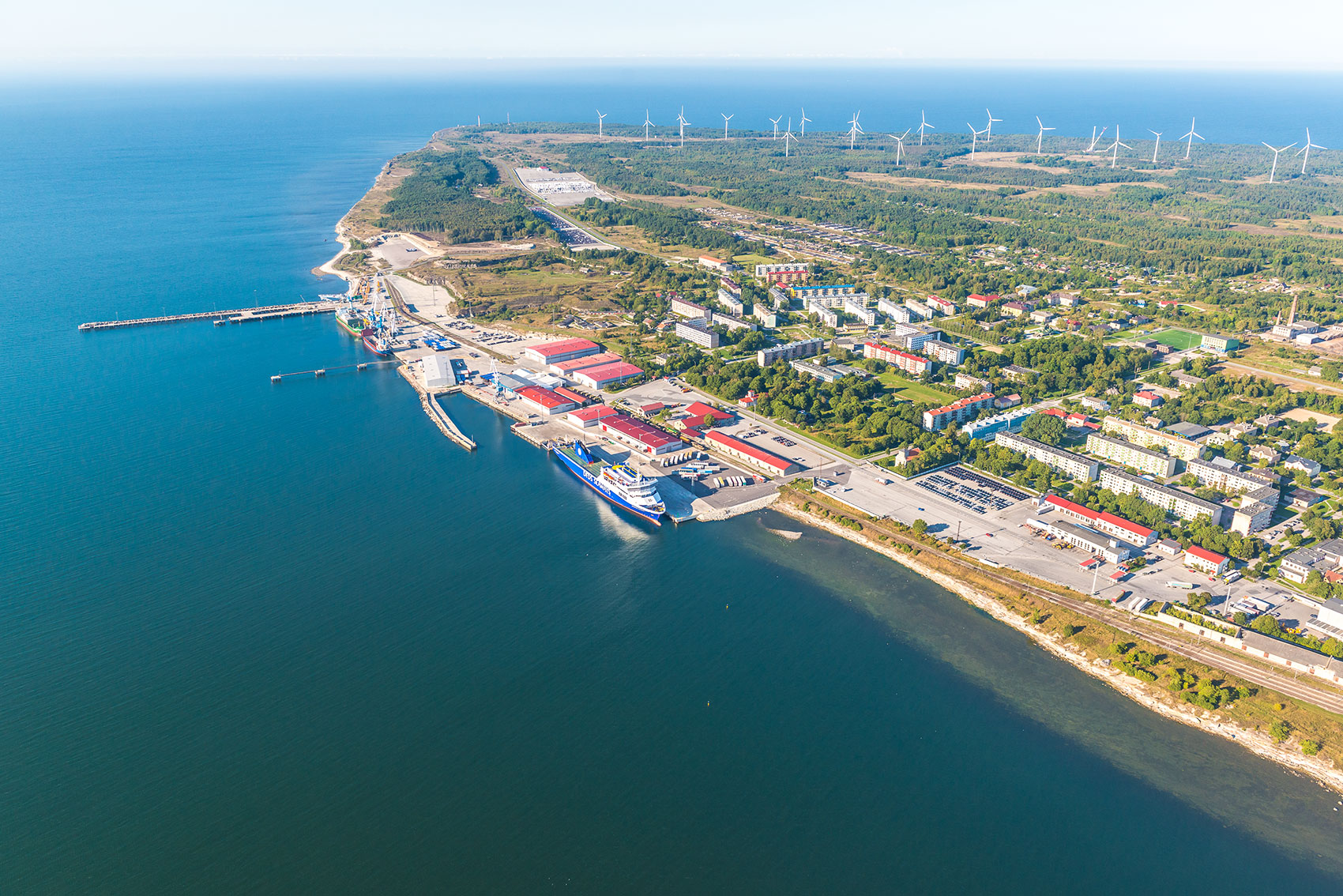

- Location of Paldiski by the Baltic Sea Location in Estonia Location in Europe
- Coordinates: 59°21′N 24°03′E
- Country: Estonia
- County: Harju
- Municipality: Lääne-Harju
- First historical record: 1377
- Fortress established: 20 July 1718
- Town rights: 3 July 1783

Area
  - Total: 60.2 km^{2} (23.2 sq mi)
- Highest elevation: 31 m (102 ft)
- Lowest elevation: 0 m (0 ft)

Population (2021)
  - Total: 3,719
  - Rank: 27th
  - Density: 61.8/km^{2} (160/sq mi)

Ethnicity (2021)
  - Estonians: 34.8%
  - Russians: 51.8%
  - Ukrainians: 6.35%
  - other: 7.05%
- Time zone: UTC+2 (EET)
  - Summer (DST): UTC+3 (EEST)
- Postal Codes: 76801, 76804-76807, 76891

Paldiski is a seaside town in northwestern Estonia on the Pakri Peninsula. The town is adjacent to the Pakri Islands in the Gulf of Finland of the Baltic Sea. It is the administrative centre of the Lääne-Harju Parish in Harju County.

Paldiski is home to a large ice-free port and is the terminus of the Tallinn-Paldiski railway line. The port is served by passenger ferry services to Kapellskär, Sweden, operated by Tallink and DFDS Seaways.

According to the 2021 Estonian census, 3 719 people live in Paldiski.

== Etymology ==
The first known name of Paldiski Bay is Rågervik, meaning 'rye island bay' in Swedish. This term was derived from the name Estonian Swedes used for the Pakri islands: Rågöarna. A small harbour, also called Rågervik, was established on the southern coast of the Pakri Peninsula in the 17th century. This port has also been referred to as Rudewa and Rågövik.

After Estonia was conquered by the Tsardom of Russia in 1710 CE, a new port was built about 1 km north of the old port, but the name Rågervik (Russian: Ро́гервик, German: Rogerwiek) remained unchanged.

On 20 August 1762, by the order of Russian Empress Catherine the Great, Rågervik was renamed Baltiyskiy Port (Russian: Балтійскій Порт, Estonian: Baltiski-Sadam German: Baltisch-Port) derived from the Baltic Sea.

The modern, phonetically spelled Estonian name Paldiski first appeared in literature in the first half of the 19th century. It became the official name of the town on 19 June 1933. Prior to 1933, the official spelling of the name in Estonian was Baltiski.

== History ==
=== Early history ===
The village of Laoküla, situated just south-east of Paldiski, was first mentioned in the Danish Census Book in 1241 CE as Laiduscæ. It was part of the historical Keila parish and had an area of 18 ploughlands.

The Pakri islands, situated just off the coast of the current town, were first mentioned in 1283 as insula Rogoy, meaning "the rye island," but it is unknown if the islands had any inhabitants at the time or which island was referred to. In 1345, Suur-Pakri Island, belonging to Padise Monastery, and some territories in Laoküla, belonging to Keila Manor, were sold to Swedish settlers. It is speculated that the sales happened as a result of the Saint George's Night Uprising of 1343, to shield the coast from rebellious Estonians. Some of the settlers may have been from Uusimaa, as Padise Monastery owned territories there.

The first written records of human activity on this site are about Pakri in 1377. The village would have been on the eastern edge of modern Paldiski, in the middle of the peninsula. In Estonian, Pakri Peninsula and the Pakri Islands are named after Pakri.

Väike-Pakri was first mentioned in 1425. The island was likely settled by Laoküla Swedes, as both were a part of Keila Manor. Pakri Peninsula also belonged to Keila Manor.

On the north-eastern coast of the peninsula, the village of Leetse was first mentioned in 1561, and a manor was established there in 1677. It was only during the 19th century that this village was renamed Leetse (previously referred to as Perraste, Paresta, or Pärast).

The village of Pallaste was first mentioned in 1582, with its manor being established in 1802. The manor was located 1.5 kilometers north-east of the port. The village of Ohtra, just south of Pakri, had existed since at least the end of the 17th century.

There are records of severe Russian raids and looting on the peninsula between the years of 1576–1580. The Polish also conducted raids in 1601 and 1611. This led to a significant loss of population in the area.

In 1622, Gustav II Adolf of Sweden granted the lands of the Padise monastery, including Suur-Pakri Island, to Thomas von Ramm, the former bürgermeister of Riga. Additionally, Thomas von Ramm purchased Väike-Pakri Island from Keila Manor in 1628. The Von Ramm family kept ownership of both islands and the Padise Manor until Estonia gained independence.

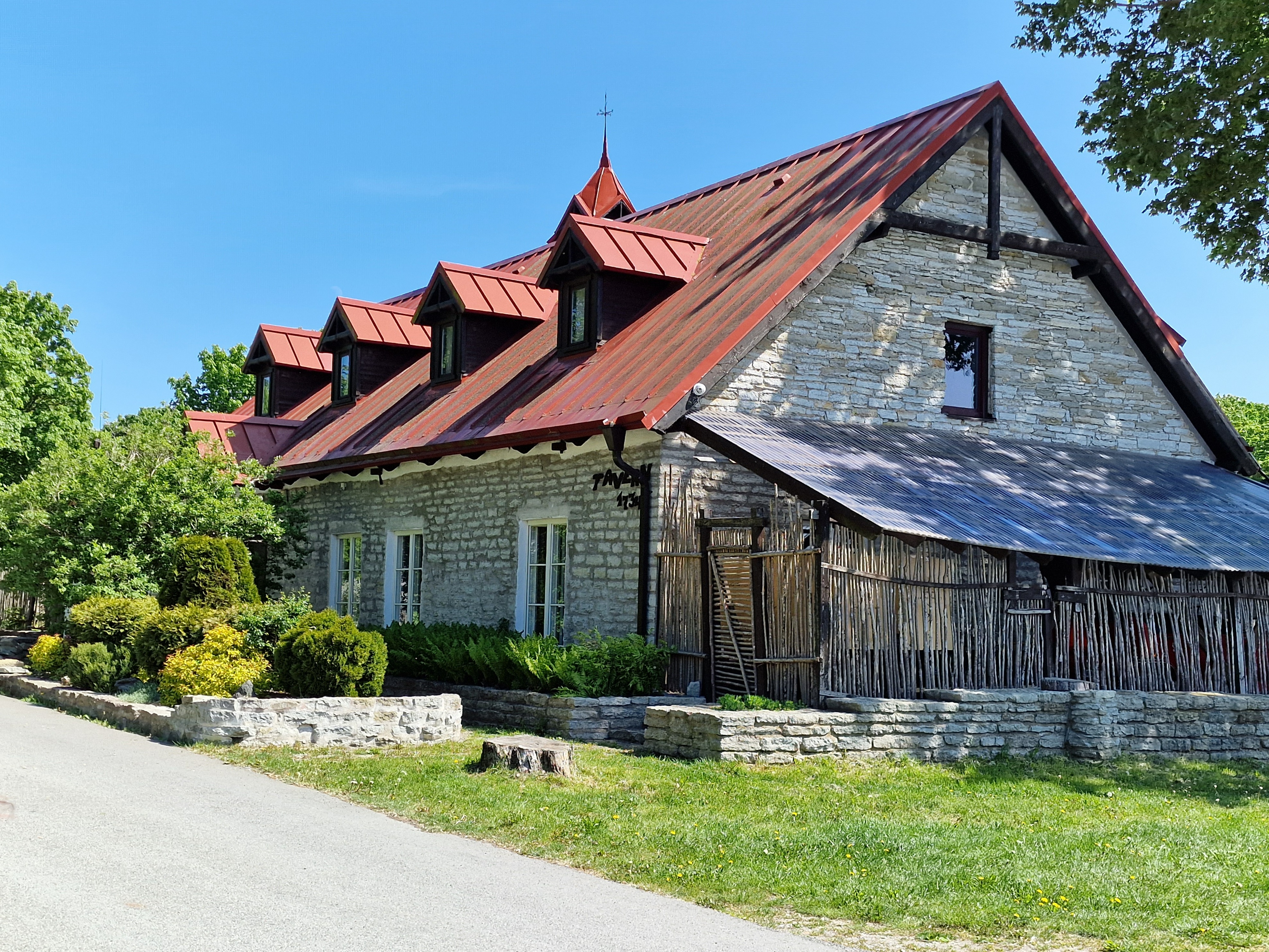
Former Peter the Great customs house, now the Peetri Toll tavern

The Swedish port of Rågervik was established during the 17th century, located approximately one kilometer south of where Peter the Great would later establish his port of the same name.

=== Russian Empire ===
==== Rågervik ====
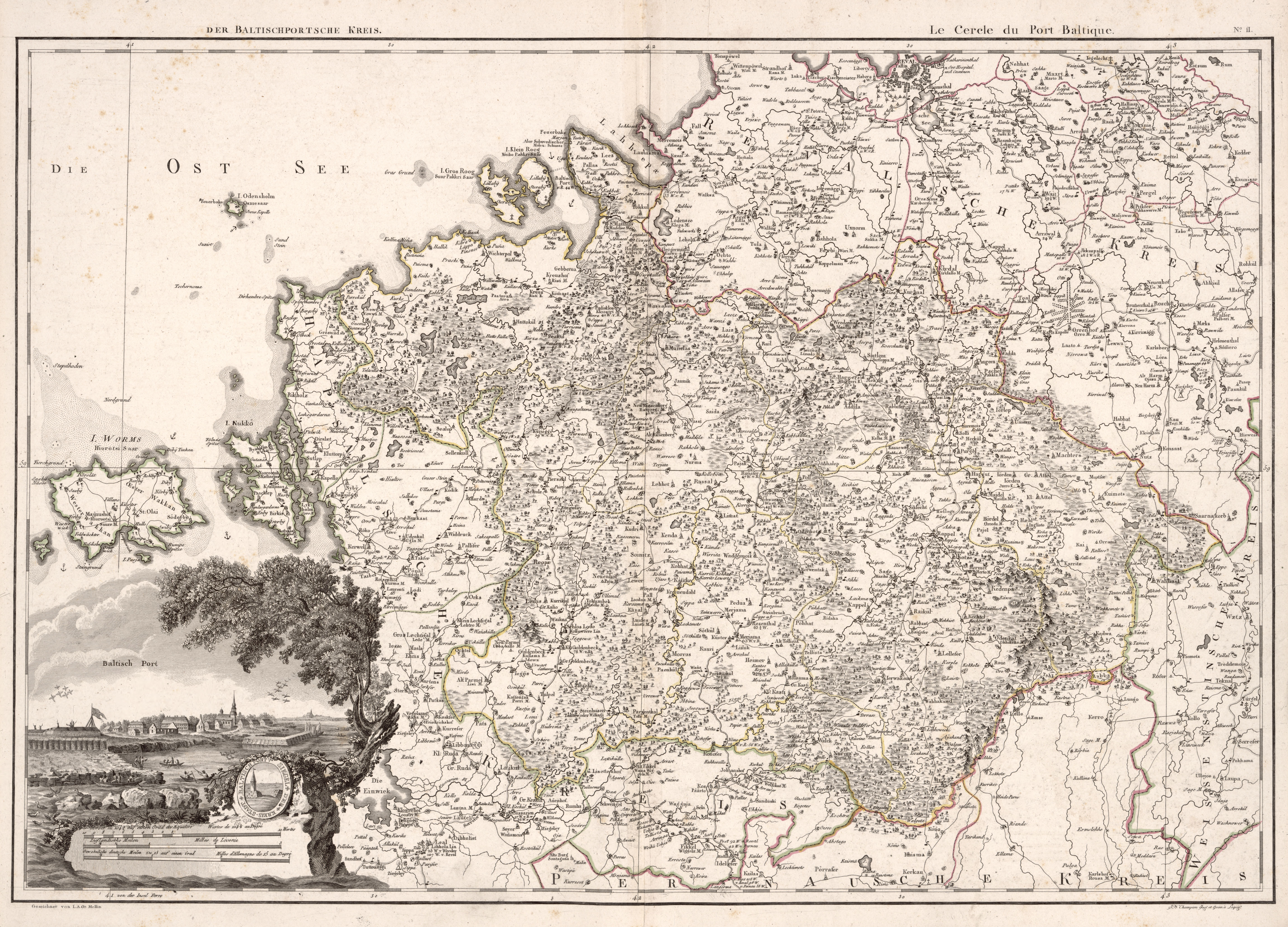
Paldiski Kreis (c. 1796)

Peter the Great, on behalf of Russia, entered the Great Northern War against Sweden in 1700 with the aim of restoring Russia's access to the Baltic Sea, which it had previously lost. He began building a fleet on the Baltic Sea in 1702, established Saint Petersburg in 1703, and by 1710, he had gained full control over Estonia and Livonia. Peter ordered a survey of the coasts of the territories to identify potential locations for building new ports. The survey determined that Rågervik Bay (modern Paldiski Bay) was the only suitable place in the southern Gulf of Finland for a new warship port, with various complications. Peter decided to temporarily utilize the existing port in Reval instead, which was not ideal for his purposes. Dissatisfied with the lack of a suitable port, Peter the Great personally began searching for the ideal location. On 23 July 1715, he decided that the new port would be built on the shores of Rågervik Bay. Preparatory work started on 20 July 1718, when Peter ceremonially initiated the construction of the fortress and the breakwater between the mainland and Väike-Pakri Island. As part of the preparations, a church, barracks, and two piers were built, but relatively little work was done on the fortress itself.

Work began in earnest in 1723, when the Great Northern War had concluded. Labourers constructed bastions and a central rampart for the fortress, a nearly 300-meter-long breakwater for the port, and a lighthouse at the tip of the peninsula. There were also plans to build a fortress on Väike-Pakri Island, right across the bay from the mainland fortress, but these plans were ultimately abandoned when Peter the Great died in January 1725. Work on the mainland slowed down significantly, and projects completely halted by 1731. Two artillery batteries were finished on the mainland in 1726 and at least one on Väike-Pakri in 1731. Two additional batteries were built on the mainland during the Russo-Swedish War of 1741–1743. In 1746, Elizabeth of Russia ordered for work to continue, but not much was done. Minor constructions on the port and the breakwater occurred in 1751 and 1753, respectively.

==== Baltiiski Port ====
On 20 August 1762, Catherine the Great of Russia renamed the port to Baltiiski Port. She also tasked Burkhard Christoph von Münnich, a fortification expert, with finishing the project of fortifying the port. Münnich presented his plan in 1763, but it was deemed too grandiose and less deserving of funds than the port in Kronstadt. No new construction began, and only existing projects were maintained. Münnich died in 1767. On 18 November 1768, Catherine the Great ordered for work to stop. At this time, the breakwater on the mainland was 400 meters long, with the breakwater on Väike-Pakri being 100 meters long. The port was 447 meters by 1067 meters in area.

Baltiiski Port received town status on 3 July 1783 being the center of the Baltiiski administrative division that existed between 1783 and 1796. Between 1787 and 1820, Baltiiski Port also held the status of a county town, gaining a courthouse and other governmental institutions.

On 6 March 1790, during the Russo-Swedish War of 1788–1790, Swedish warships sailing under Dutch flags seized the port for a day and destroyed its artillery batteries. The bay was blockaded by the Swedish and British navies in the fall of 1808 during the Finnish War. When the blockade was lifted, Russian ships left for Kronstadt, leading to the British bombardment of Baltiiski Port, which caused little damage. As part of the Crimean War, British warships passed through between 23-25 June in 1854, though they did not bombard the town.

By the end of the 18th century, the fortress and garrison had lost their importance and were abandoned, but the garrison was temporarily reestablished several times later on. The town's civilian population had grown significantly, reaching around 500 inhabitants

The construction of the St. Petersburg-Tallinn-Paldiski railway was finished in 1870, with the intent to utilize the ice-free port of Baltiiski to transport goods to St. Petersburg. A passenger station, a depot, a water tower, a fire station, a naval school, and warehouses were built. By 1914, the town had reached around 1,300 inhabitants.

On 22 June 1912, Russian Emperor Nicholas II and German Kaiser Wilhelm II met in Baltiiski for the last time before going to war with each other two years later, as part of World War I. Only one Russian warship was destroyed in the bay in WWI. During one shelling by the Germans, 20 houses were destroyed and 10 people died. Germans also tried to bomb the town from a zeppelin but failed. Near the end of the war, Russia started building fortifications around the town and established artillery batteries at the tip of the peninsula. After the war, Russian and German prisoners of war were exchanged through the port.

=== Interwar period ===
As Estonia became independent in 1918, the importance of Baltiiski Port significantly decreased, with the main economic activities now being fishing and fish processing. In the 1930s, marble from Vasalemma began to be transported to Sweden through the port. On 19 June 1933, the official name of the town became Paldiski. Before that, Baltiiski and Paldiski were used interchangeably. For a short while in 1939, the town was officially renamed to Lahe, however the change was cancelled by the Soviet occupation.

In 1939, the Soviet Union built a naval base in Paldiski, under the Bases Treaty it forced on Estonia. In 1940, the whole population of Paldiski and the Pakri Islands were forcibly relocated and replaced by Soviet military personnel. Under the Soviets, the settlement became a closed town and stayed that way until the early 1990s.

=== Soviet era ===
Soviet naval base headquarters were located in Paldiski. During World War II, Germans occupied the town on 28 August 1941 and left in 1944. During the retreat, most of the town was burnt down, and only 20 buildings survived. In 1962, Paldiski became a nuclear submarine training centre for the Soviet Navy. The training center had a nuclear submarine constructed piece-by-piece for naval personnel training purposes. The center, known by locals as the Pentagon, was demolished by 2007. Employing some 16,000 people, and with two land-based nuclear reactors (at 70 MW and 90 MW power, respectively), it was the largest such facility in the Soviet Union. In total, the Soviet navy used the facility for 27 years. Because of its importance, the whole city was closed off with barbed wire until the military base was shut down on 31 August 1994. The Paldiski nuclear centre was handed off to the Estonian authorities on 30 September 1995.

In 1991 the Soviet Union collapsed and Estonia regained independence. To house Russian troops and those in training, many barracks had been built, which have since been left in disrepair. The nuclear reactors were shut down in 1989, first on a temporary basis because of the Chernobyl accident and later, due to the collapse of Soviet union, it became permanent. Nuclear material was transported back to Russia in 1994. The reactors were thereafter decommissioned. The reactors were protected with a sarcophagus, finished by 2006, as they were potentially dangerous due to radioactivity.

When Paldiski was a Soviet closed military townlet, incidents occurred rarely and if something did happen, it was classified. At the time Jüri Liim, the Estonian government special representative in Paldiski, had undercover access to the closed city. Per his testimony, the Pakri Islands just next to Paldiski were practice bombing targets for the Soviet air force, including nuclear bombers. There were no actual nuclear bombs used, but bombs that were in similar weight and size categories. When real bombs were used, small tremors could sometimes be felt in Paldiski and at the nuclear reactors.

Nuclear personnel were concerned about potential cracks or other issues with the reactor because of the bombs. Practice flight paths were often routed over Paldiski. Once, a live bomb fell by accident into the local kindergarten's cabbage field. The bomb malfunctioned and caused no damage. On another occasion, a bomb accidentally fell 15 meters from the working nuclear reactors. This bomb also malfunctioned and did not explode.

=== After Estonia regained independence ===
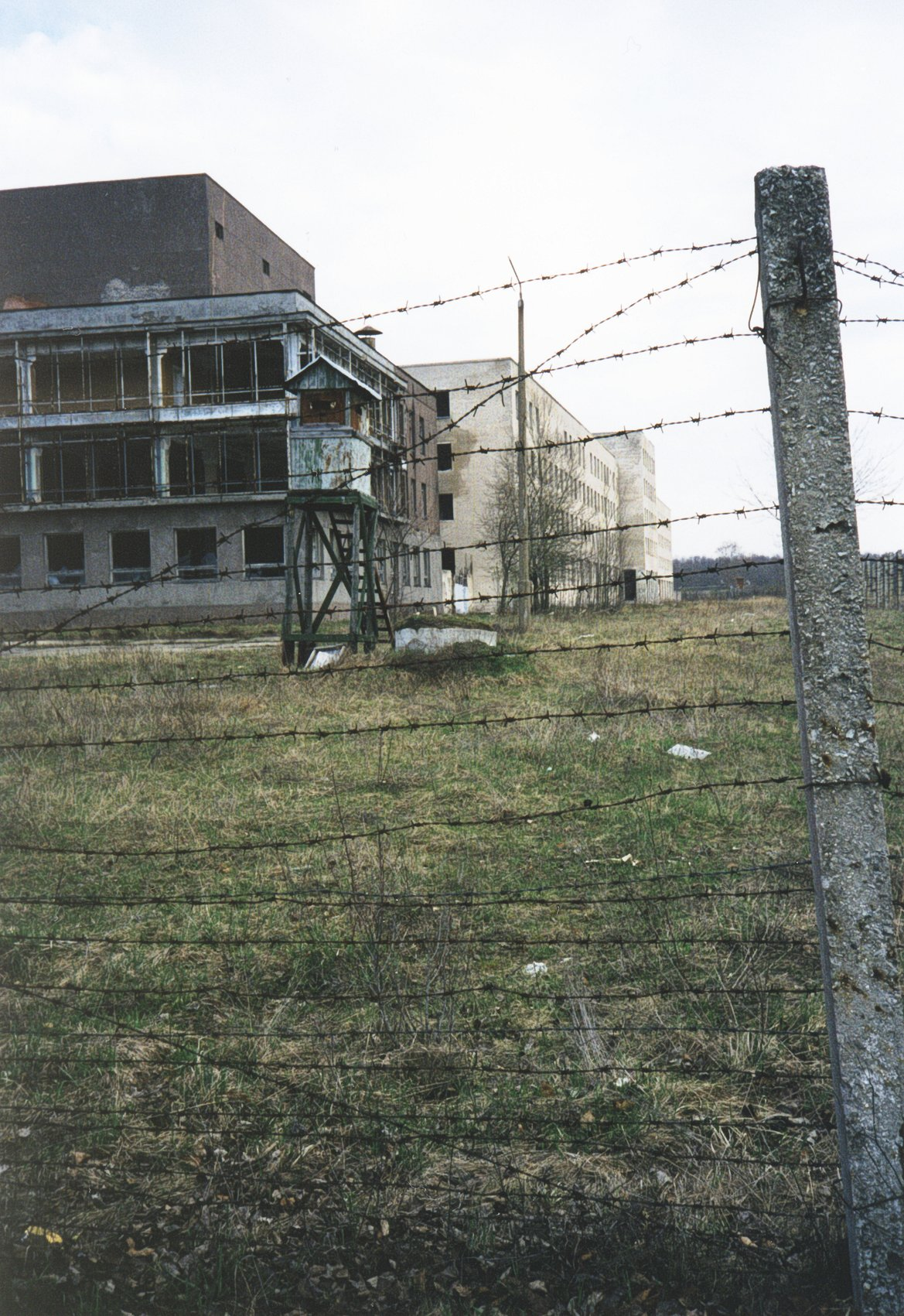
Abandoned military buildings in Paldiski (1999)

After Estonia restored its independence, the city had few Estonian citizens, and Paldiski was subordinated to Keila until 30 October 1996. Located some 45 km west of Tallinn, Paldiski was then made a municipality within Harju County. Derelict Soviet-style apartment buildings made up much of the town, and the relics of military bases were widespread. A significant portion of the town's residents are ethnic Russians, originally from other parts of Soviet Union and were relocated to Estonian Soviet Socialist Republic by Soviet policy. The ferry company Tallink operates a regular connection with Kapellskär in Sweden. Danish ferry operator DFDS also operates a regular connection on the same route.

Operation "Ämblik" (Spider) was conducted in Paldiski on 16 March 1993 by 33 Estonian police officers and 40 border guards to establish law in the area, including in the Russian military base. At the time, there were around 1,500 members of the Russian armed forces still in the town. The aim of the police operation was to contain illegal activities, including the weapons trade, and to restrict the activities of career criminals in Paldiski, who formerly had the run of the town. On 9 March 1993, several Russian armed forces officers were detained by Estonian authorities in Tallinn due to an attempt to sell illegal firearms. The Russian government did not agree to participate in Operation Ämblik, as preparations were kept in secrecy. Confusion in Paldiski among Russian military personnel helped Estonian officials to curb their activities. Jüri Liim later reported that the operation was a success and had reduced crime.

On 21 April 1993, there were six Estonian police officers and Estonian border service personnel permanently stationed in the town.

=== Today ===
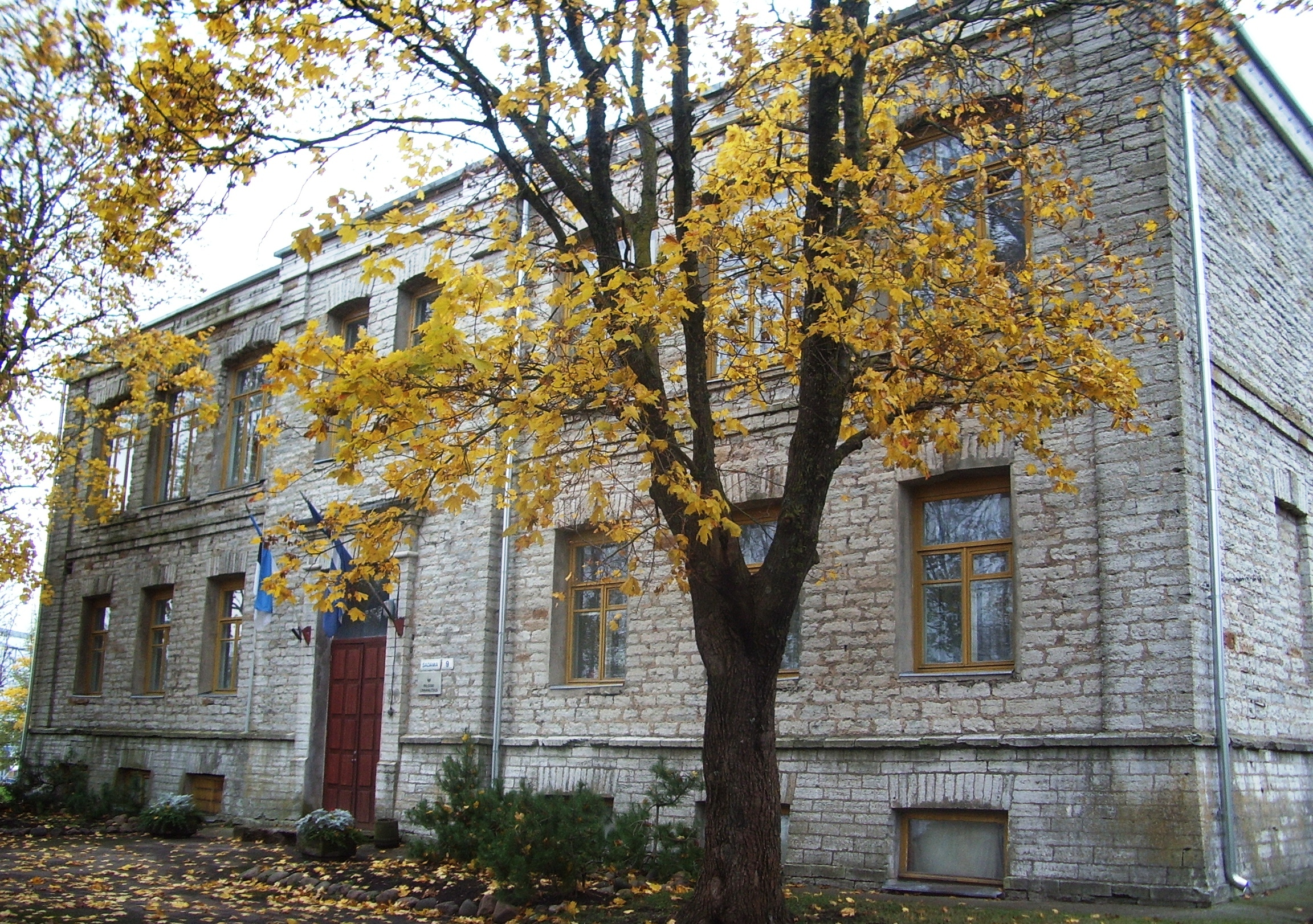
Town government building

Amenities in Paldiski today include three grocery stores, a pizza place, a tavern, and a café.

The Logistics Battalion of the Estonian Defense Forces is stationed in Paldiski.

The Pakri Science and Industrial Park with its 60 hectare Pakri Smart Industrial City lies within the limits of the city.

After existing as a separate second-level municipal unit, the town was formally merged into Lääne-Harju Parish in October 2017.

=== Politics ===
On 20 July 1718, Peter the Great of Russia ceremoniously initiated the construction of the breakwater between Väike-Pakri island and the mainland, which was never fully completed. Nowadays, Paldiski commemorates this event by celebrating its birthday on July 20th.

Paldiski was granted town rights on 3 July 1783.

The flag of Paldiski between September 27, 1994, and October 24, 2017 (abolished after merging into Lääne-Harju Parish)

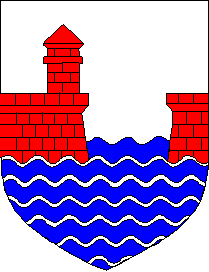
The coat of arms of Paldiski between December 1, 1994, and October 24, 2017 (abolished after merging into Lääne-Harju Parish)

== Demographics ==
Ethnic composition 1922–2021
Ethnicity	1922		1934		1941		1959		1970		1979		1989		2000		2011		2021	
Ethnicity	amount	%	amount	%	amount	%	amount	%	amount	%	amount	%	amount	%	amount	%	amount	%	amount	%
Estonians	961	91.3	799	93.9	119	96.0	250	7.38	381	5.52	233	3.19	186	2.42	1260	29.7	1338	32.8	1294	34.8
Russians	31	2.95	19	2.23	2	1.61	-	-	4683	67.8	5325	72.8	5467	71.1	2217	52.2	2183	53.4	1926	51.8
Ukrainians	-	-	0	0.00	-	-	-	-	1124	16.3	1010	13.8	1264	16.4	-	-	283	6.93	236	6.35
Belarusians	-	-	-	-	-	-	-	-	362	5.24	498	6.81	507	6.59	-	-	136	3.33	112	3.01
Finns	-	-	0	0.00	0	0.00	-	-	30	0.43	22	0.30	18	0.23	-	-	17	0.42	15	0.40
Jews	0	0.00	1	0.12	0	0.00	-	-	34	0.49	22	0.30	16	0.21	-	-	5	0.12	5	0.13
Latvians	-	-	1	0.12	0	0.00	-	-	12	0.17	14	0.19	15	0.20	-	-	9	0.22	17	0.46
Germans	41	3.90	23	2.70	-	-	-	-	-	-	7	0.10	3	0.04	-	-	1	0.02	0	0.00
Tatars	-	-	0	0.00	-	-	-	-	-	-	47	0.64	44	0.57	-	-	15	0.37	9	0.24
Poles	-	-	0	0.00	0	0.00	-	-	-	-	17	0.23	23	0.30	-	-	16	0.39	13	0.35
Lithuanians	-	-	0	0.00	0	0.00	-	-	30	0.43	19	0.26	27	0.35	-	-	14	0.34	12	0.32
unknown	0	0.00	0	0.00	0	0.00	0	0.00	0	0.00	0	0.00	0	0.00	25	0.59	4	0.10	6	0.16
other	19	1.81	8	0.94	3	2.42	3137	92.6	251	3.63	97	1.33	120	1.56	746	17.6	64	1.57	72	1.94
Total	1052	100	851	100	124	100	3387	100	6907	100	7311	100	7690	100	4248	100	4085	100	3719	99.9

== Climate ==
Climate data for Paldiski (located at Pakri Meteorological station) normals 1991–2020, extremes 1865–present
Month	Jan	Feb	Mar	Apr	May	Jun	Jul	Aug	Sep	Oct	Nov	Dec	Year
Record high °C (°F)	8.8 (47.8)	8.8 (47.8)	16.3 (61.3)	24.2 (75.6)	31.1 (88.0)	31.0 (87.8)	33.5 (92.3)	31.6 (88.9)	28.2 (82.8)	20.5 (68.9)	13.9 (57.0)	10.5 (50.9)	33.5 (92.3)
Mean daily maximum °C (°F)	−0.1 (31.8)	−0.7 (30.7)	2.4 (36.3)	7.8 (46.0)	13.2 (55.8)	17.5 (63.5)	21.0 (69.8)	20.4 (68.7)	15.8 (60.4)	9.8 (49.6)	4.7 (40.5)	1.9 (35.4)	9.5 (49.1)
Daily mean °C (°F)	−2.1 (28.2)	−2.9 (26.8)	−0.2 (31.6)	4.3 (39.7)	9.3 (48.7)	13.9 (57.0)	17.5 (63.5)	17.1 (62.8)	12.9 (55.2)	7.5 (45.5)	2.9 (37.2)	0.0 (32.0)	6.7 (44.1)
Mean daily minimum °C (°F)	−4.1 (24.6)	−5 (23)	−2.5 (27.5)	1.5 (34.7)	6.0 (42.8)	10.8 (51.4)	14.4 (57.9)	13.9 (57.0)	10.1 (50.2)	5.2 (41.4)	1.0 (33.8)	−2 (28)	4.1 (39.4)
Record low °C (°F)	−30.1 (−22.2)	−29.7 (−21.5)	−23.2 (−9.8)	−13.7 (7.3)	−4.5 (23.9)	−3.5 (25.7)	2.5 (36.5)	−1.2 (29.8)	−4.5 (23.9)	−8.4 (16.9)	−17.8 (0.0)	−27.7 (−17.9)	−30.1 (−22.2)
Average precipitation mm (inches)	44 (1.7)	30 (1.2)	31 (1.2)	32 (1.3)	28 (1.1)	52 (2.0)	55 (2.2)	65 (2.6)	59 (2.3)	65 (2.6)	56 (2.2)	52 (2.0)	567 (22.3)
Average precipitation days (≥ 1.0 mm)	12	7	8	8	6	8	8	10	11	11	12	13	114
Average relative humidity (%)	86	86	80	77	76	80	80	79	81	82	86	89	81
Source: Estonian Weather Service (precipitation and precipitation days 1971–2000)

== Education and community ==
Elementary, middle and high school education are provided by Pakri Kool.

There are several churches in town. The Estonian Evangelical Lutheran Church is dedicated to St Nicholas. Although closed for some years, this church has now reopened, with services held every Sunday at lunchtime. There are also a Pentecostal church, a Methodist church, and an Orthodox church.

== Transport ==
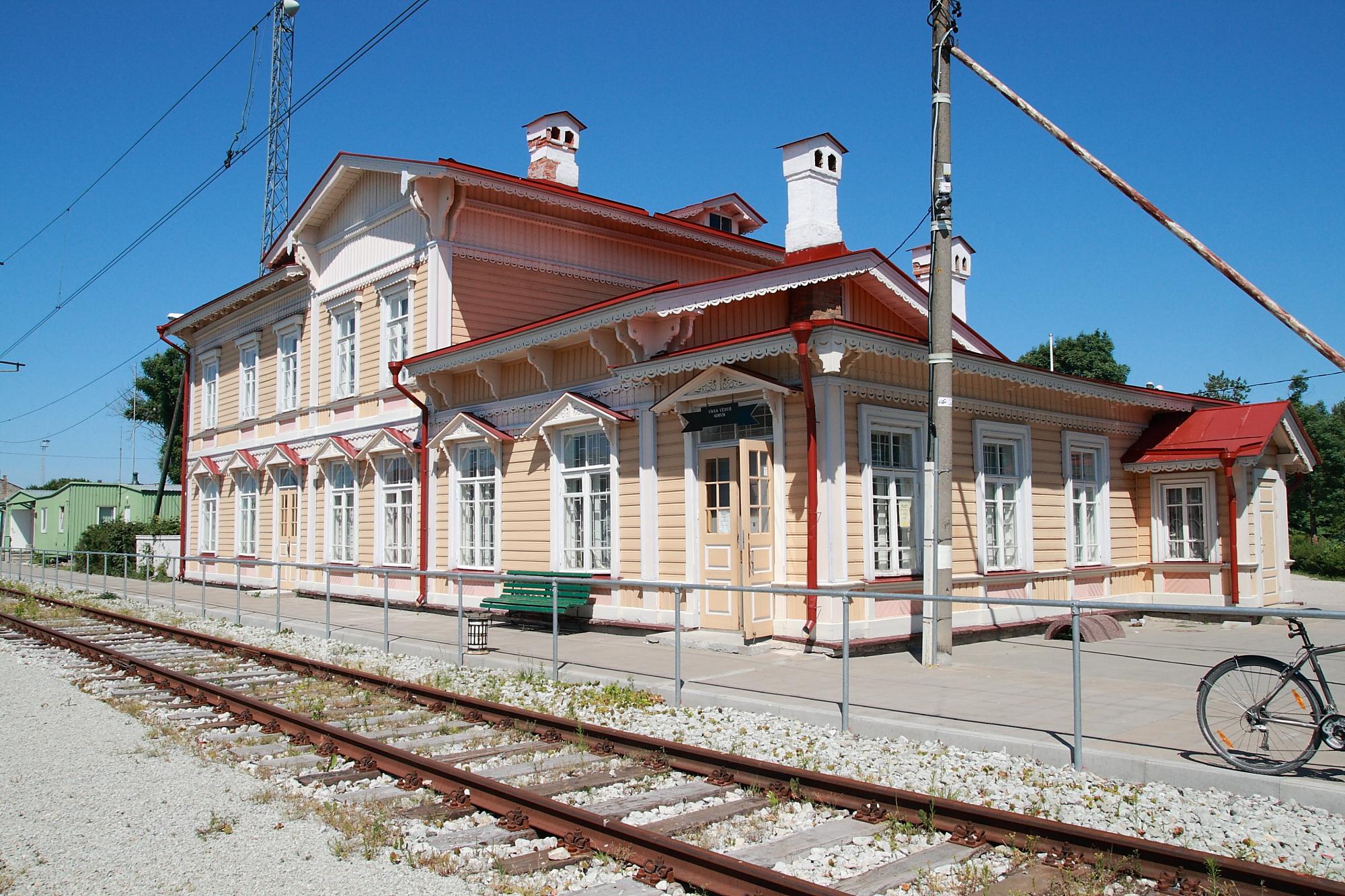
Paldiski railway station in 2011

Paldiski is served by Paldiski railway station, a terminus station on the Elron rail line between Tallinn and Paldiski, providing a direct link to the Estonian capital city.

Two ports service Paldiski, the Northern Port and the Southern Port.

The old Soviet submarine training facility (known as the Pentagon) was demolished in 2007 to make way for a large logistics park.

== Energy ==
The Pakri wind farm is located in Paldiski at the tip of the Pakri peninsula near the old lighthouse. It consists of eight wind turbines of type Nordex N-90, and generates 18.4 MW of clean electricity, when the wind matches the parameters of the turbines.

A 550 MW / 6 GWh (12-hour) pumped-storage hydroelectricity plant is scheduled for 2028.

The Balticconnector bi-directional natural gas pipeline between Ingå, Finland and Paldiski has operated since 2020. Construction of the Paldiski LNG terminal was finished in 2022.

Estonia's long-term plans for nuclear power envisage the adjacent Pakri Islands as a potential site for the country's first power plant.

== In popular culture ==
The 1999 film Screwed in Tallinn is set in Paldiski, and large parts of the 2002 film Lilya 4-ever were filmed in Paldiski.

The 2015 music video for Alan Walker's song "Faded" was in partly filmed in and around Paldiski.

Paldiski is featured in the video games Euro Truck Simulator 2 and Girls' Frontline.

The town and port feature prominently in Arthur Ransome's yacht cruising memoir Racundra's First Cruise.

== Notable residents ==
- Salawat Yulayev (1754–1800), poet and singer, Bashkir national hero
- Amandus Adamson (1855–1929), Estonian sculptor and painter; lived and worked in Paldiski
- Balder Tomasberg (1897–1919), Estonian painter, his paintings are made in pastels and watercolour
- Evald Gering (1918 – 2007), sports shooter, competed in three events at the 1960 Summer Olympics
- Viire Valdma (born 1960), stage, TV and film actress.
- Margus Allikmaa (born 1961), theatre leader, cultural figure and politician; Minister of Culture, 2002/2003
- Vladimir Vorobyov (born 1969), Admiral and a deputy commander in chief of the Russian Navy since 2024.

== Gallery ==
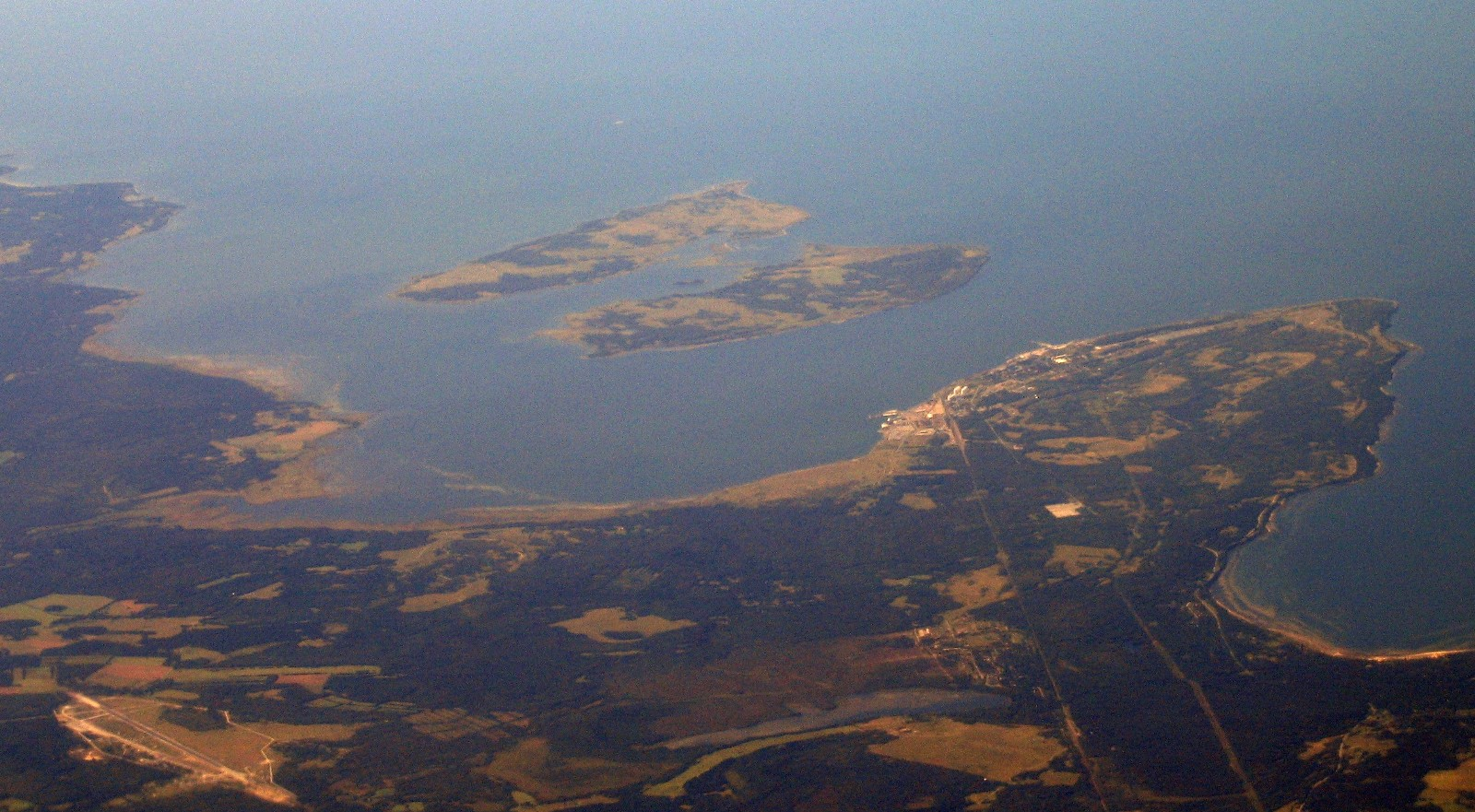
In this photo Paldiski can be seen located on the Pakri Peninsula.

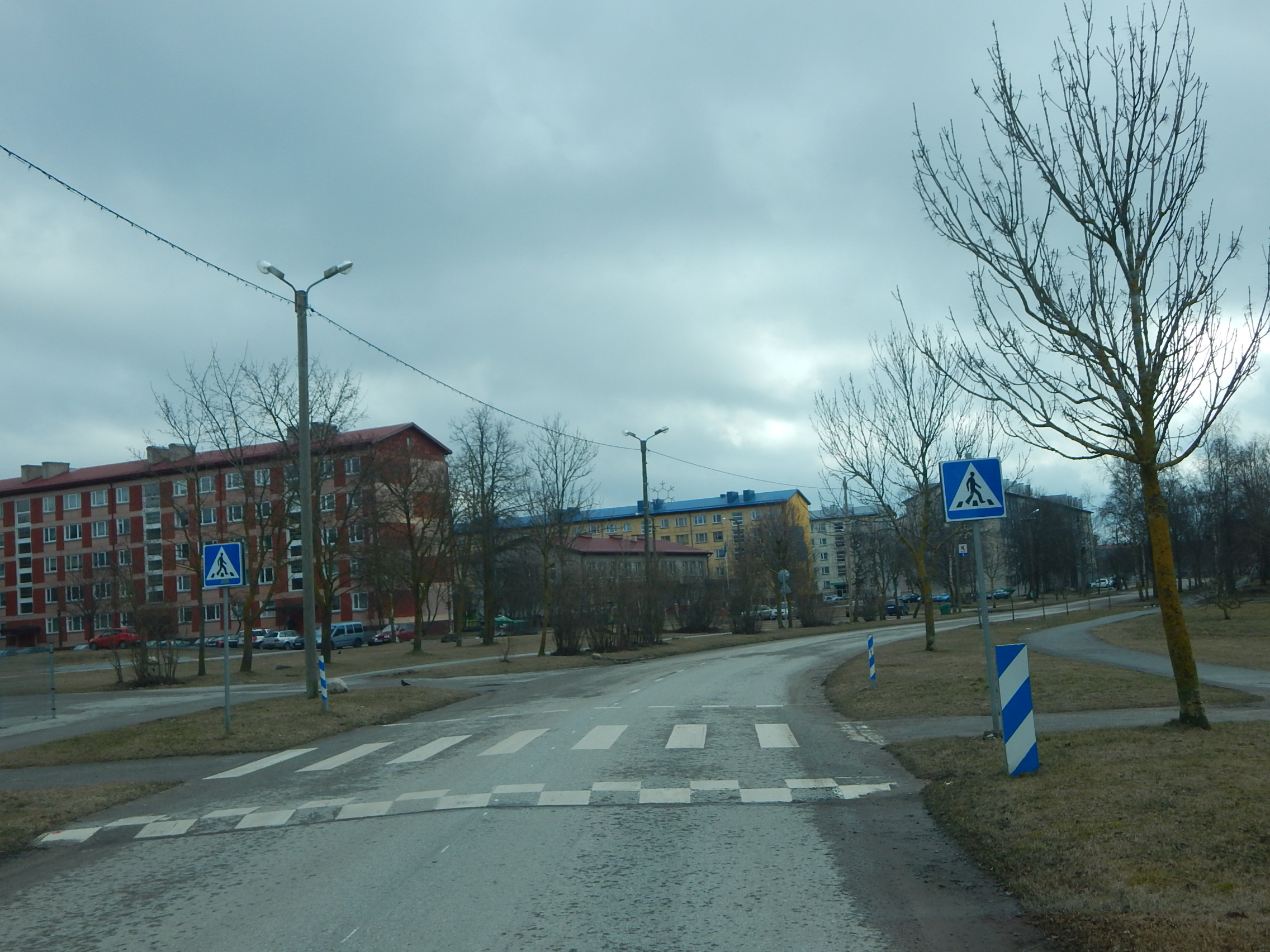
Street in Paldiski

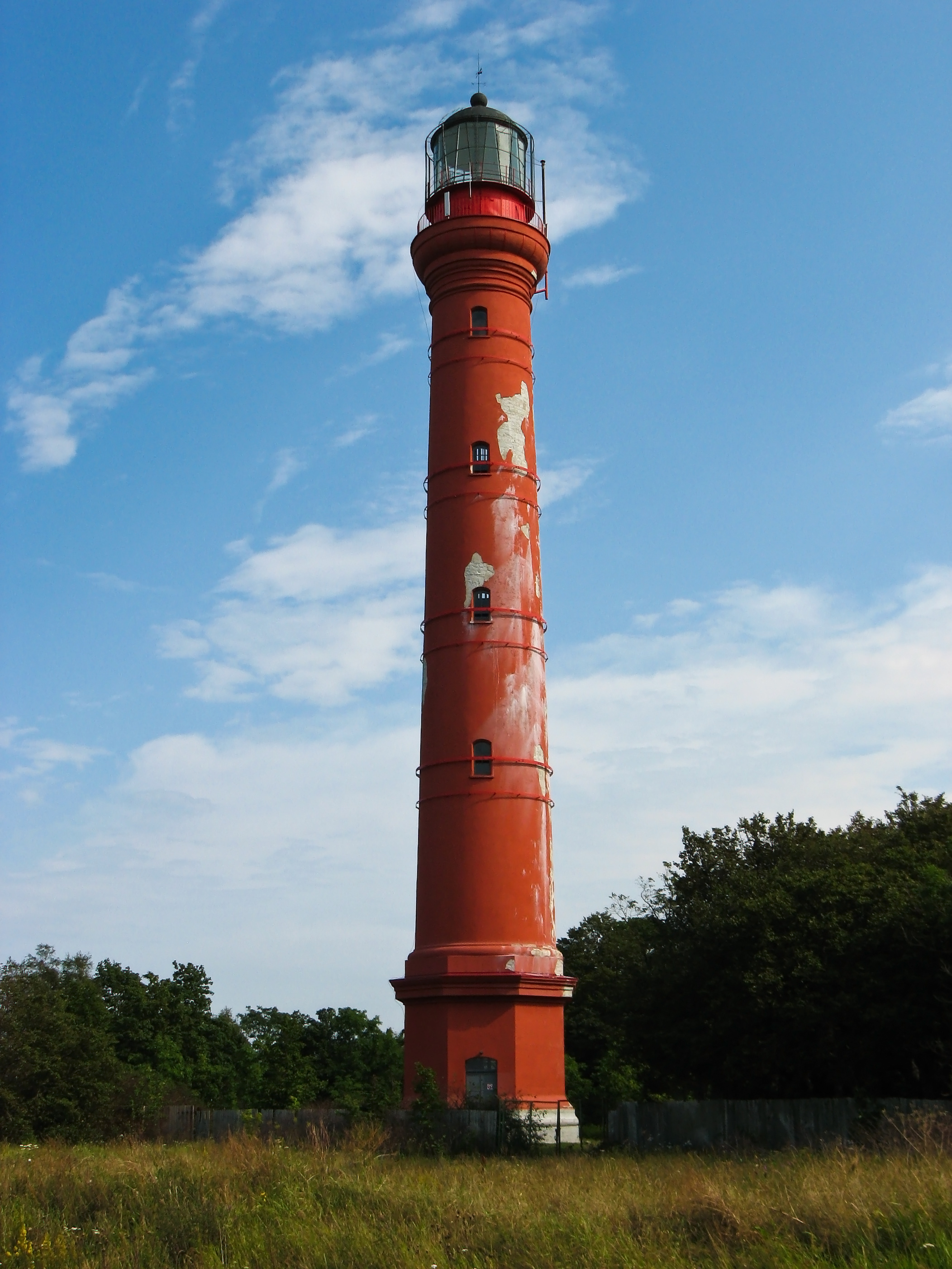
Pakri Lighthouse

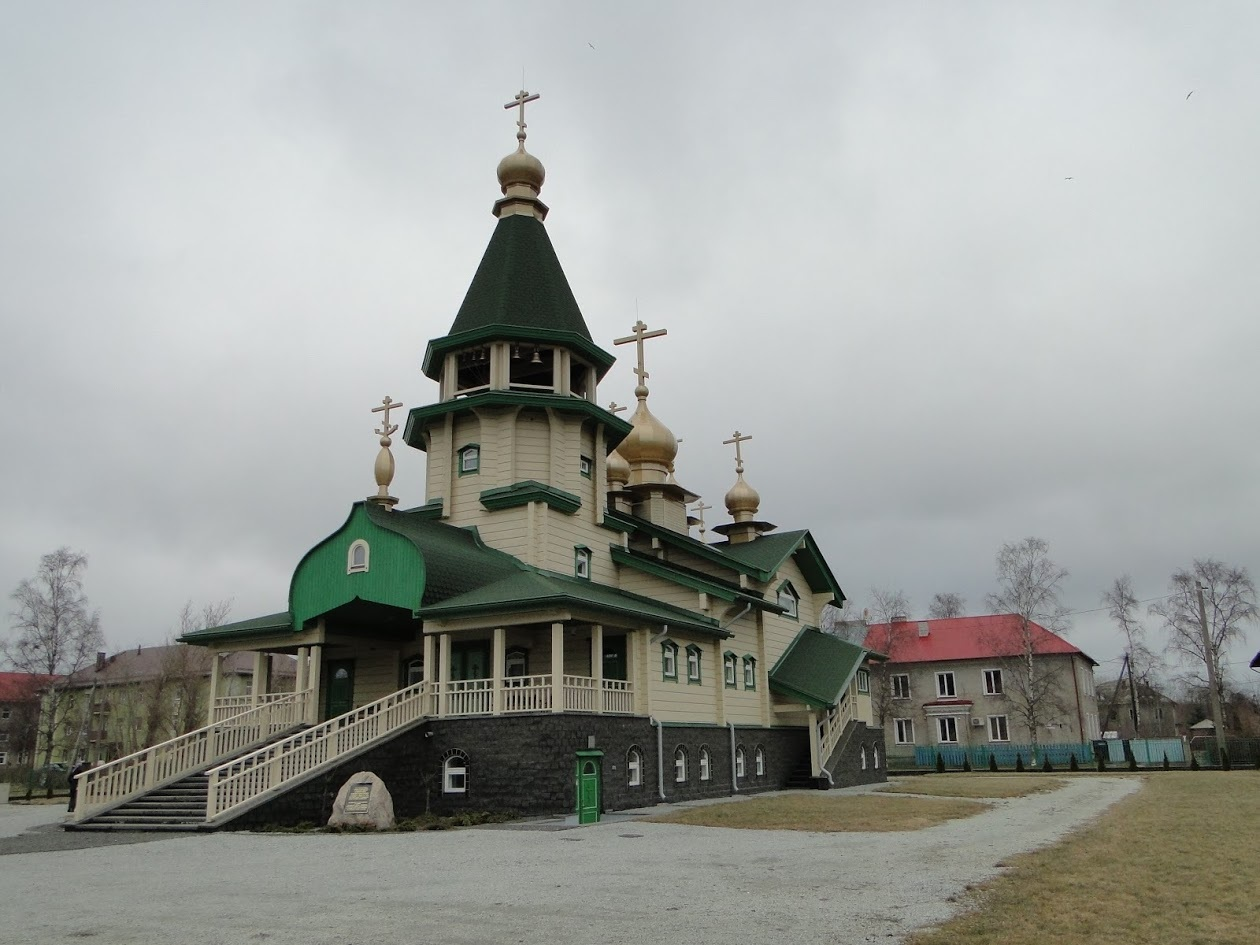
St Sergius Orthodox Church

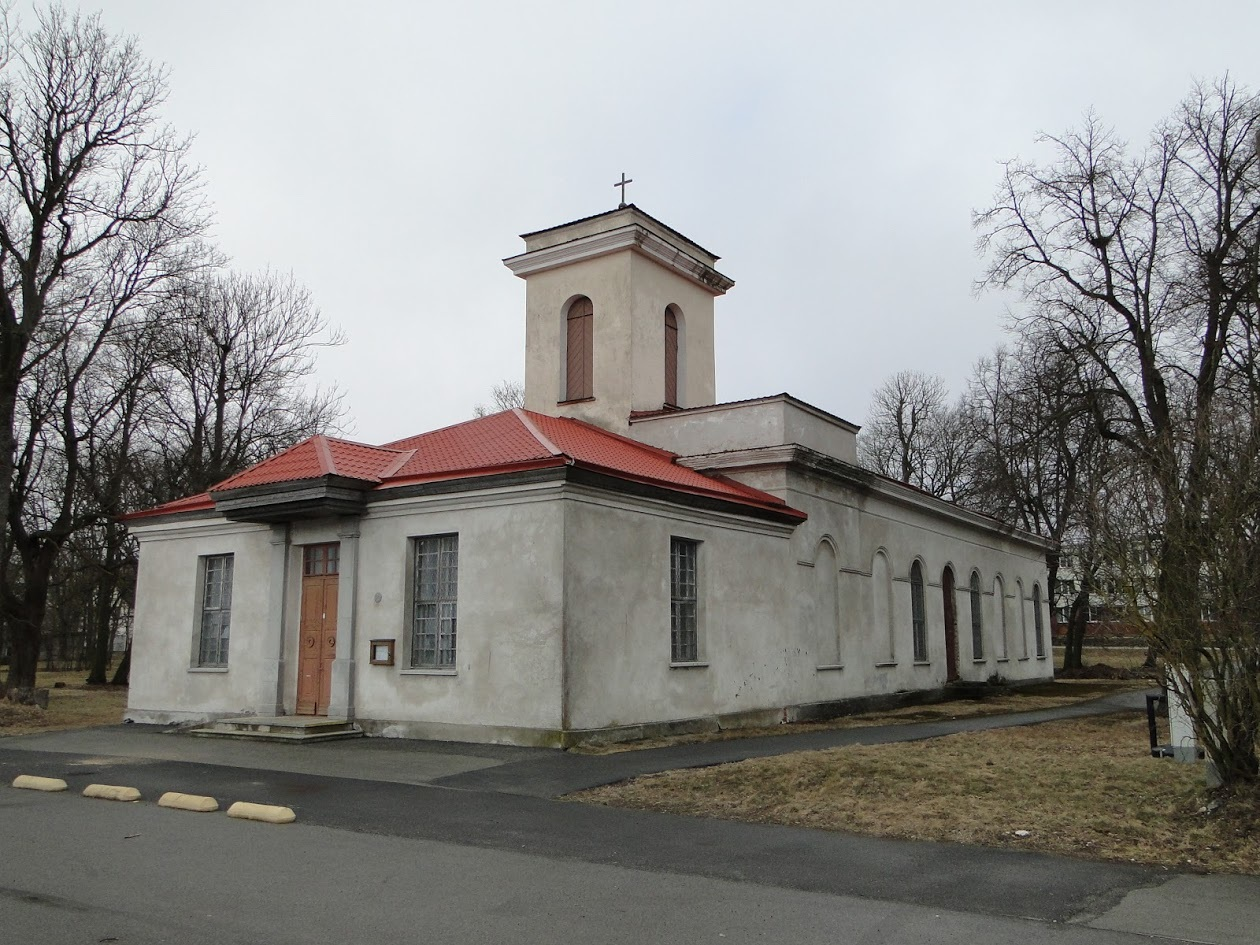
St. Nicholas Lutheran Church

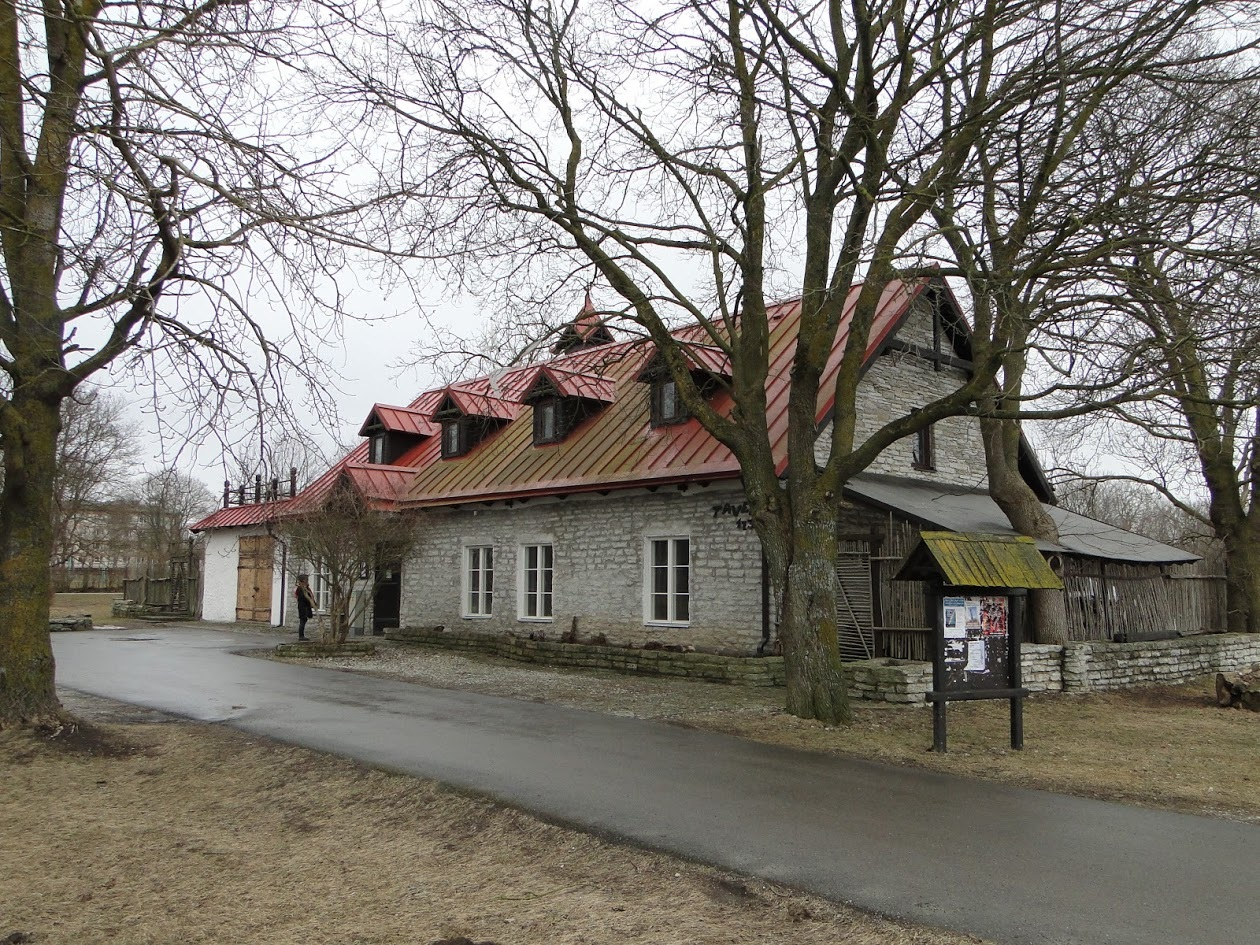
Previously, the custom of Peter the Great (now café)

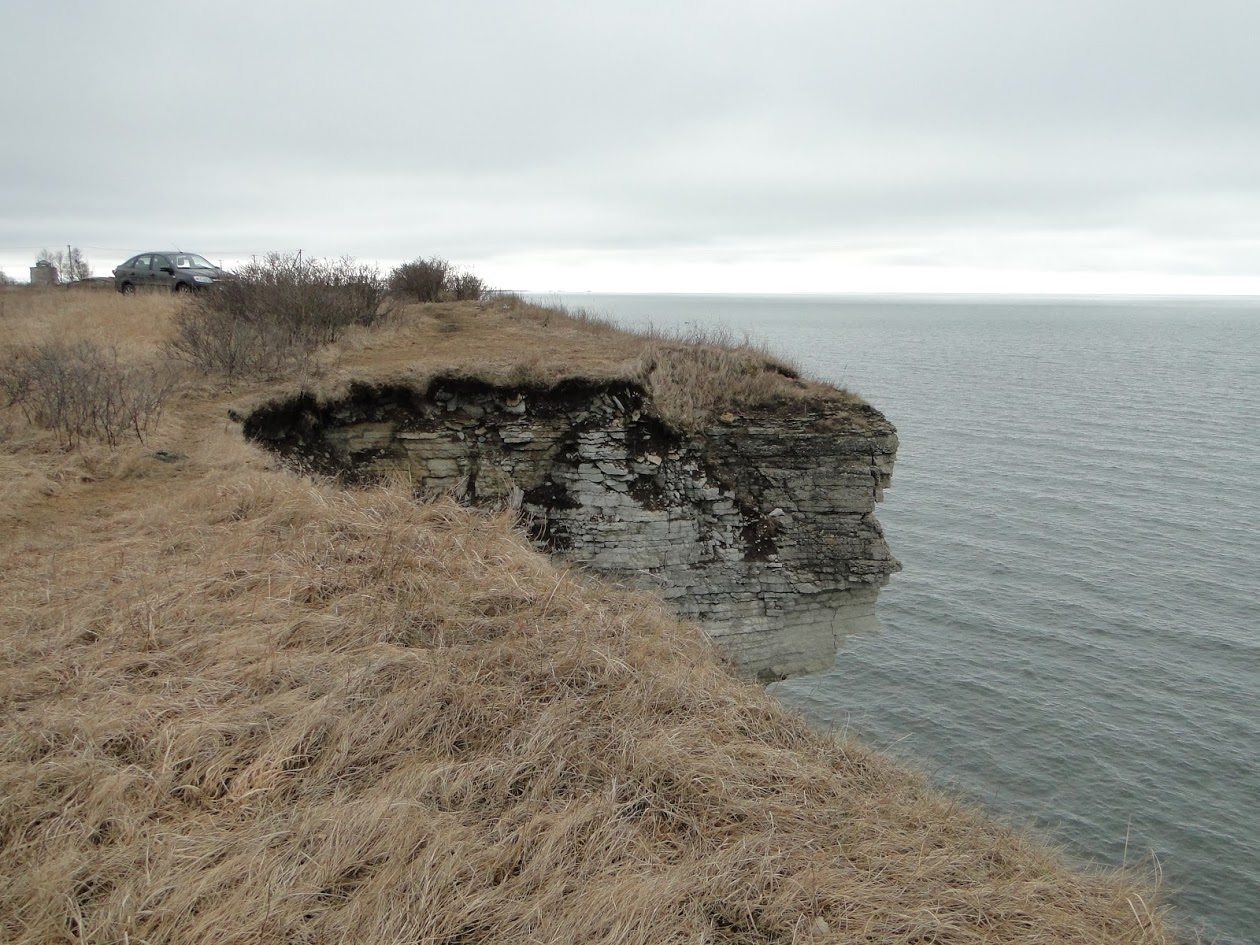
Rocky shore near the town

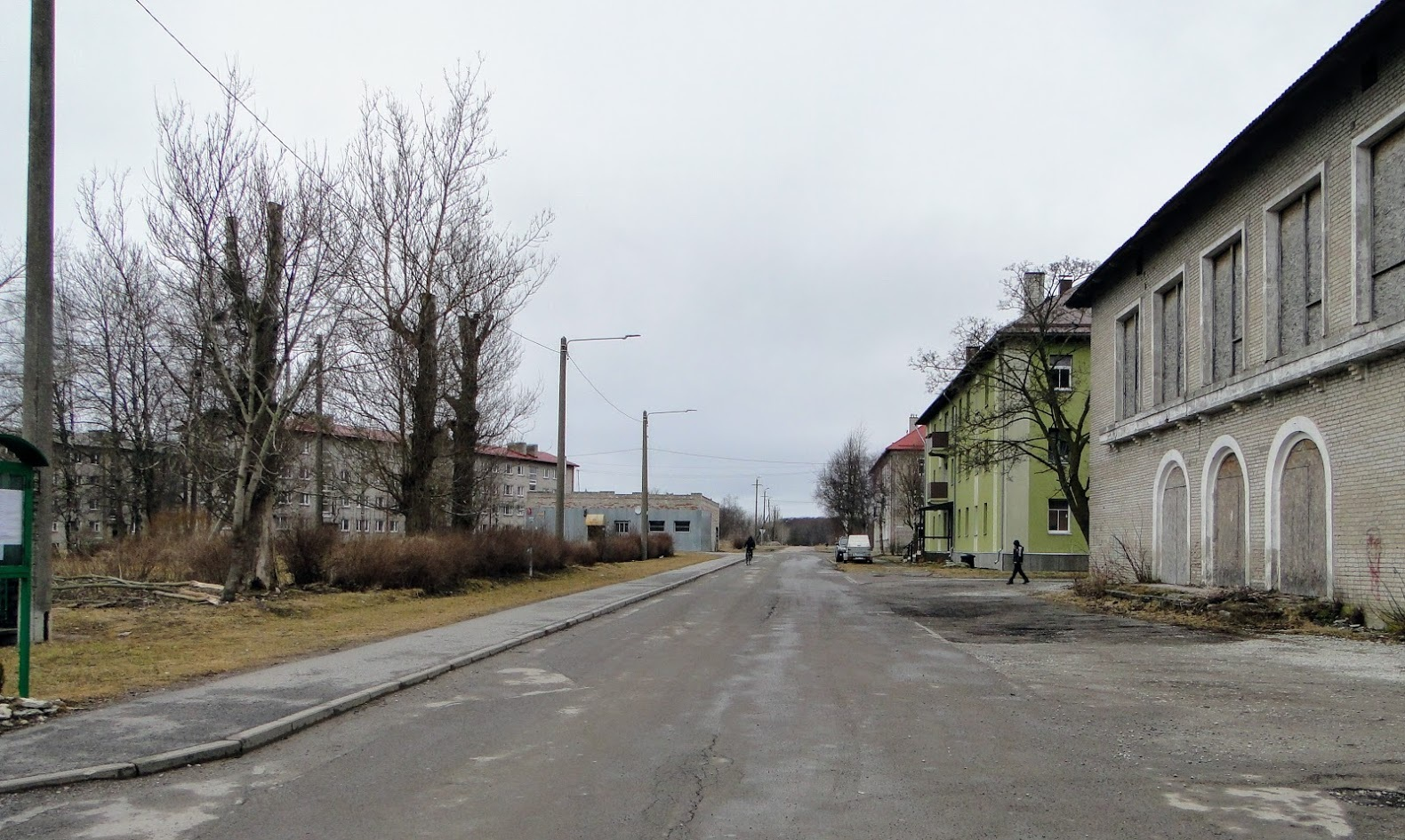
Tuule Street

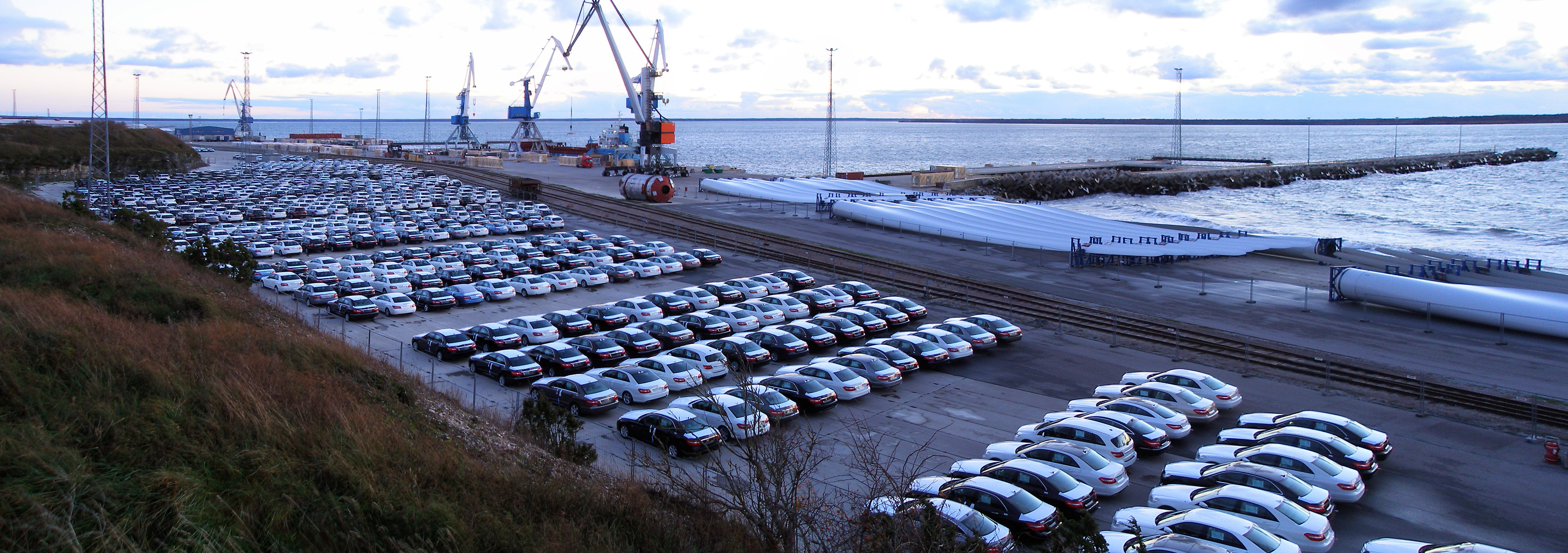
Northern Port
