= Vladimir Vorobyov (disambiguation) =

Vladimir Vorobyov may refer to:

- Vladimir Vorobyov (the elder) (1876–1940), archpriest of the Russian Orthodox Church
- Vladimir Mikhailovich Vorobyov (born 1969) is an officer of the Russian Navy
- Vladimir Vorobiev (born 1972), Russian hockey player
