= Väike-Pakri Airfield =

Airfield in Estonia

Väike-Pakri Airfield Väike-Pakri lennuväli
- IATA: none; ICAO: none

Summary
- Coordinates: 59°20′49″N 23°57′45″E

Maps
- Location in Estonia
- Location in Väike-Pakri

Runways
Direction	Length		Surface
Direction	ft	m	Surface
			Asphalt/concrete

Väike-Pakri Airfield (Estonian: Väike-Pakri lennuväli) was an airfield on Väike-Pakri Island, Harju County, Estonia.

The airfield was used by Soviet Air Force. It was used not as a standard strategic base, but specifically as an auxiliary unpaved strip serving the Soviet Air Force Aviation Target Range / Training Polygon (lennuväepolügoon) established across the Pakri Islands.
