= Pakri Peninsula =

Peninsula in Estonia

Coordinates: 59.357171°N 24.055395°E

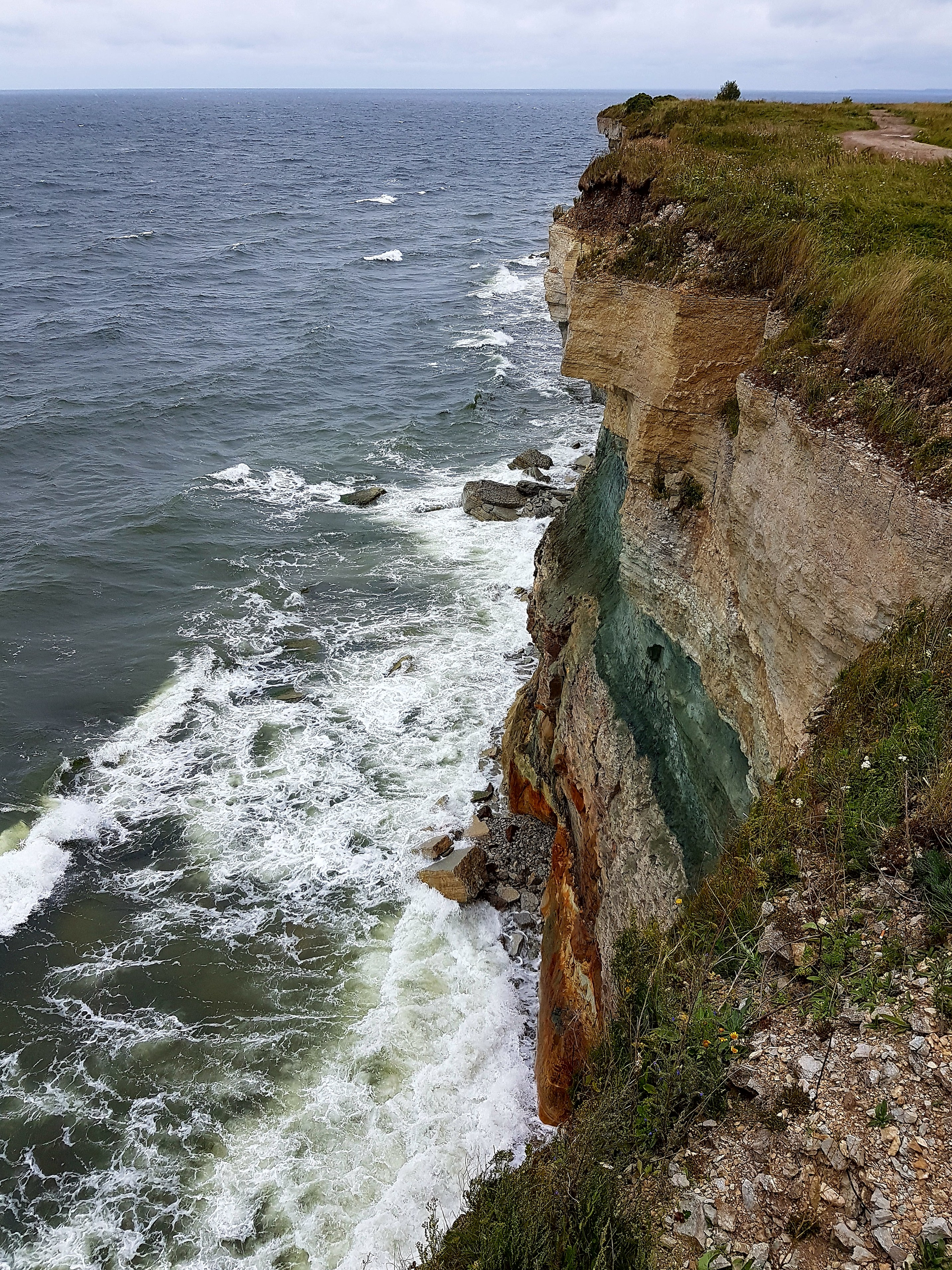
Cliff on the Pakri Peninsula

Drone video of the Pakri Peninsula (April 2023)

The Pakri Peninsula extends from the northwestern mainland of Estonia's Harju County into the Baltic Sea. Its length is 12 km and its area is about 40 km^{2}.

Portions of the peninsula were protected in 1998 as the Pakri Landscape Conservation Area on the basis of its unique geological features, valuable communities of flora and fauna, and historical interest.

The port town of Paldiski is located on the peninsula.
