= Nuclear power in Estonia =

In 2009, the Riigikogu (Estonian Parliament) approved National Development Plan of the Energy Sector until 2020, provisioning necessity to train specialists and pass relevant legislation by 2012 which would be necessary if Estonia were to carry out construction of a nuclear plant.

In February, 2011 Government of Estonia approved of a nuclear power plant to be built by year 2023. In the meantime an increase in the output of oil shale fired power plants is planned by renovating additional blocks of soviet built plants. However, in the long run a forcible decrease in the oil shale share of the country's energy output is planned, with the nuclear power plant superseding oil shale with its environmental implications.

Pakri Islands have been named as one of the 6 potential sites for the reactor; however, at this early stage those remain only speculations.

In 2025, it has been confirmed that a NPP will be built near Kunda.

== See also ==
- Energy in Estonia
