= Pakri Landscape Conservation Area =

Protected area in Estonia

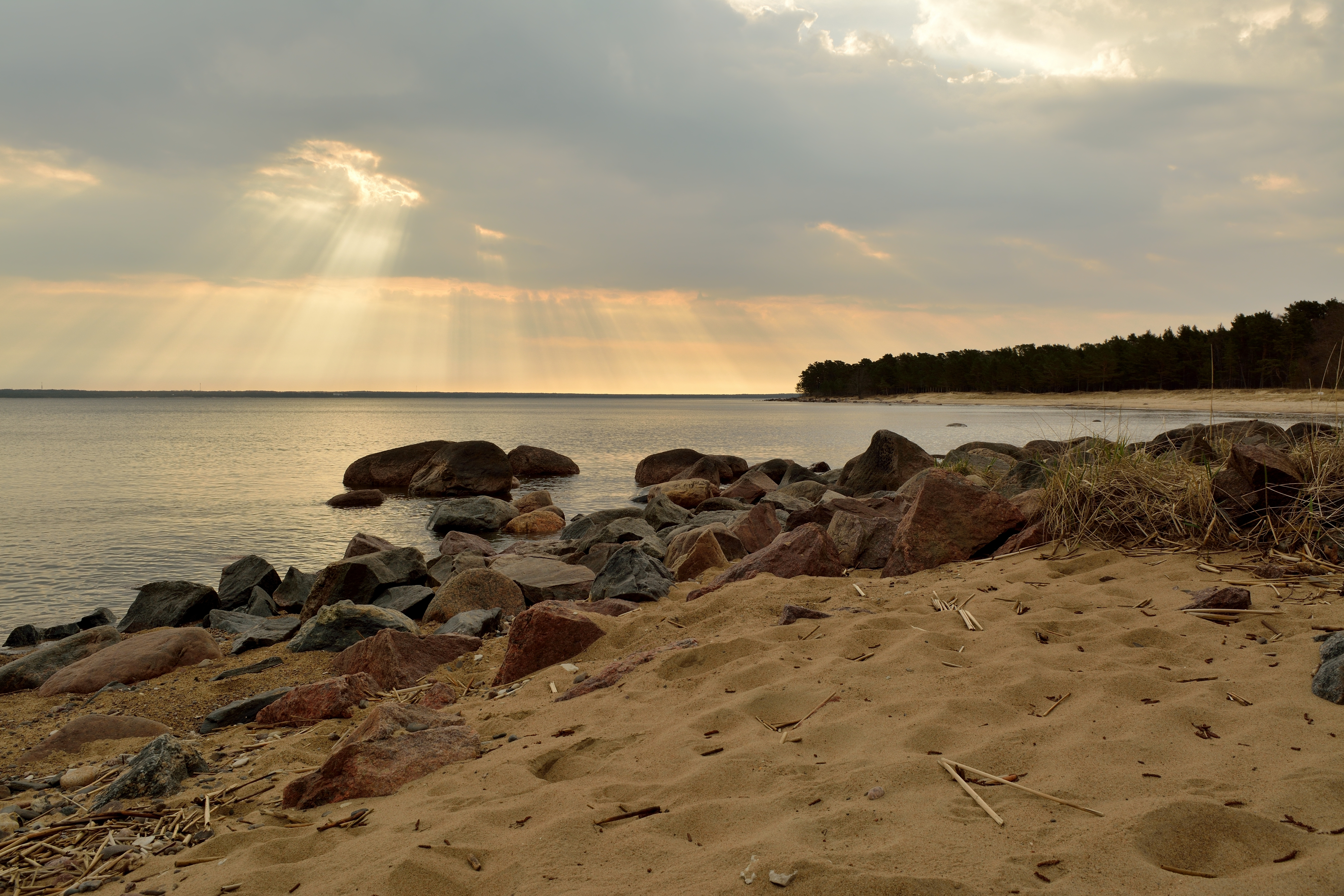

- Location within Estonia
- Location: Estonia
- Coordinates: 59°20′N 24°00′E
- Area: 3,164 ha (7,820 acres)
- Established: 1998

Pakri Landscape Conservation Area (Estonian: Pakri maastikukaitseala) is a nature park which is located in Harju County, Estonia.

The area of the nature park is 3,164 ha.

The protected area was founded in 1998 to protect landscapes and biodiversity of Pakri Islands.
