= Pakri Islands =

Islands in Estonia

Pakri Islands Swedish: Rågöarna
Native name: Pakri saared

Geography
- Location: Baltic Sea
- Coordinates: 59°20′N 23°57′E
- Major islands: Väike-Pakri, Suur-Pakri
- Area: 24.7 km^{2} (9.5 sq mi); 12.9 and 11.6 km^{2}
- Coastline: 42 km (26.1 mi); 18.7 and 23.3 km
- Highest elevation: 17 m (56 ft)

Administration
- Estonia
- County: Harju County
- Municipality: Lääne-Harju Parish

Demographics
- Population: 6 (2009)

The Pakri islands (Estonian: Pakri saared, Swedish: Rågöarna) are two Estonian islands in the Gulf of Finland of the Baltic Sea: Suur-Pakri and Väike-Pakri (Swedish: Stora Rågö and Lilla Rågö). Administratively the islands are part of the town of Paldiski. For centuries the two islands were inhabited by Estonian Swedes, until during World War II their entire civilian population was forced to leave.

== Etymology ==
The Swedish name of the islands, Rågöarna, means 'Rye Islands'; historically rye was the primary crop grown on the island. Thus Stora Rågö and Lilla Rågö mean Big Rye Island and Small Rye Island, respectively. Alternative names for the two islands are Västra Rågö/Västerö and Östra Rågö/Österö (West Island and East Island).

In terms of area, Väike-Pakri (lit. 'Lesser Pakri') is actually somewhat larger than Suur-Pakri (lit. 'Greater Pakri'). The reason for this contradiction is probably that Suur-Pakri had more inhabitants and better farming lands and was reckoned as more important.

== Geography ==
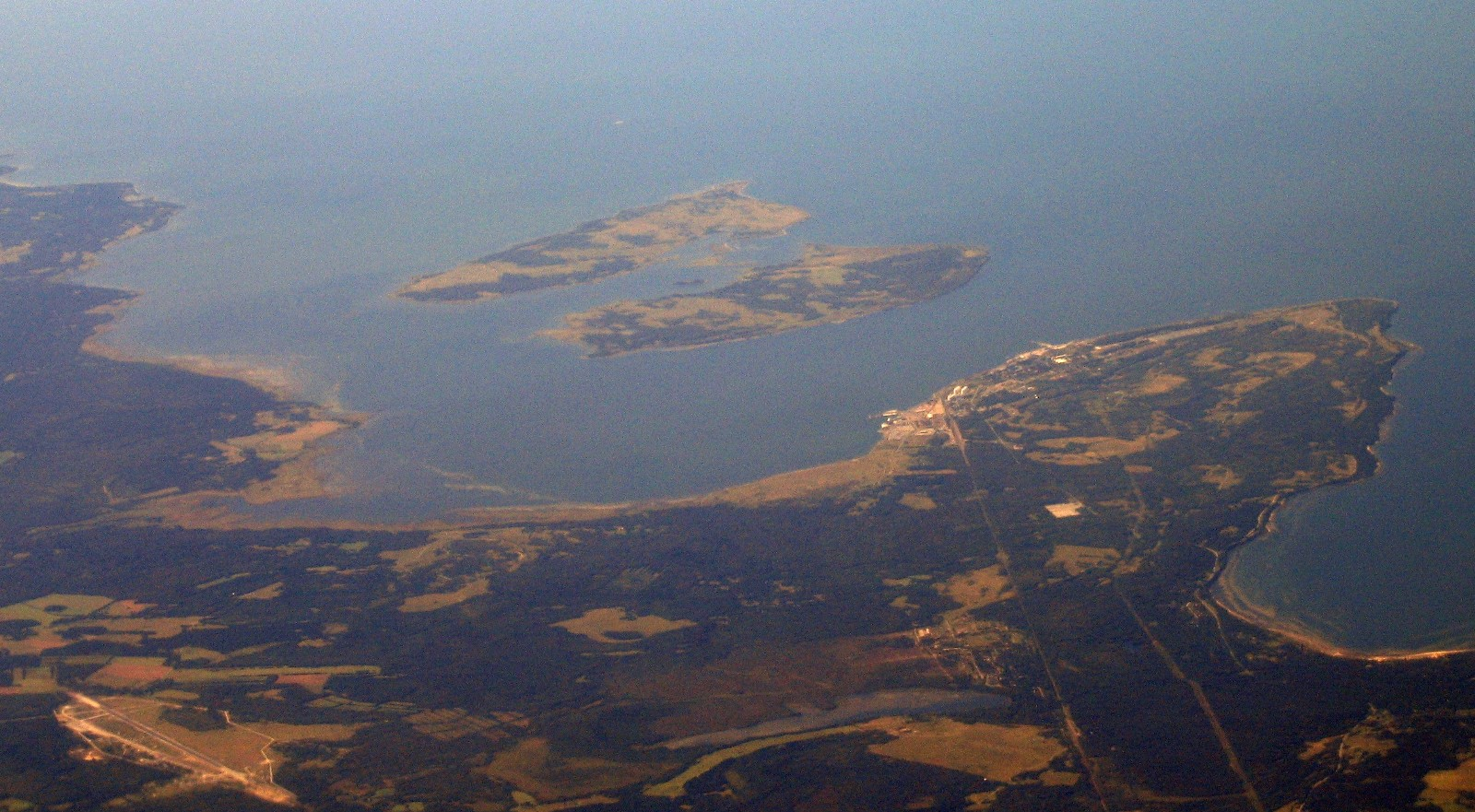
An aerial photo of the Pakri Islands and the Pakri Peninsula.

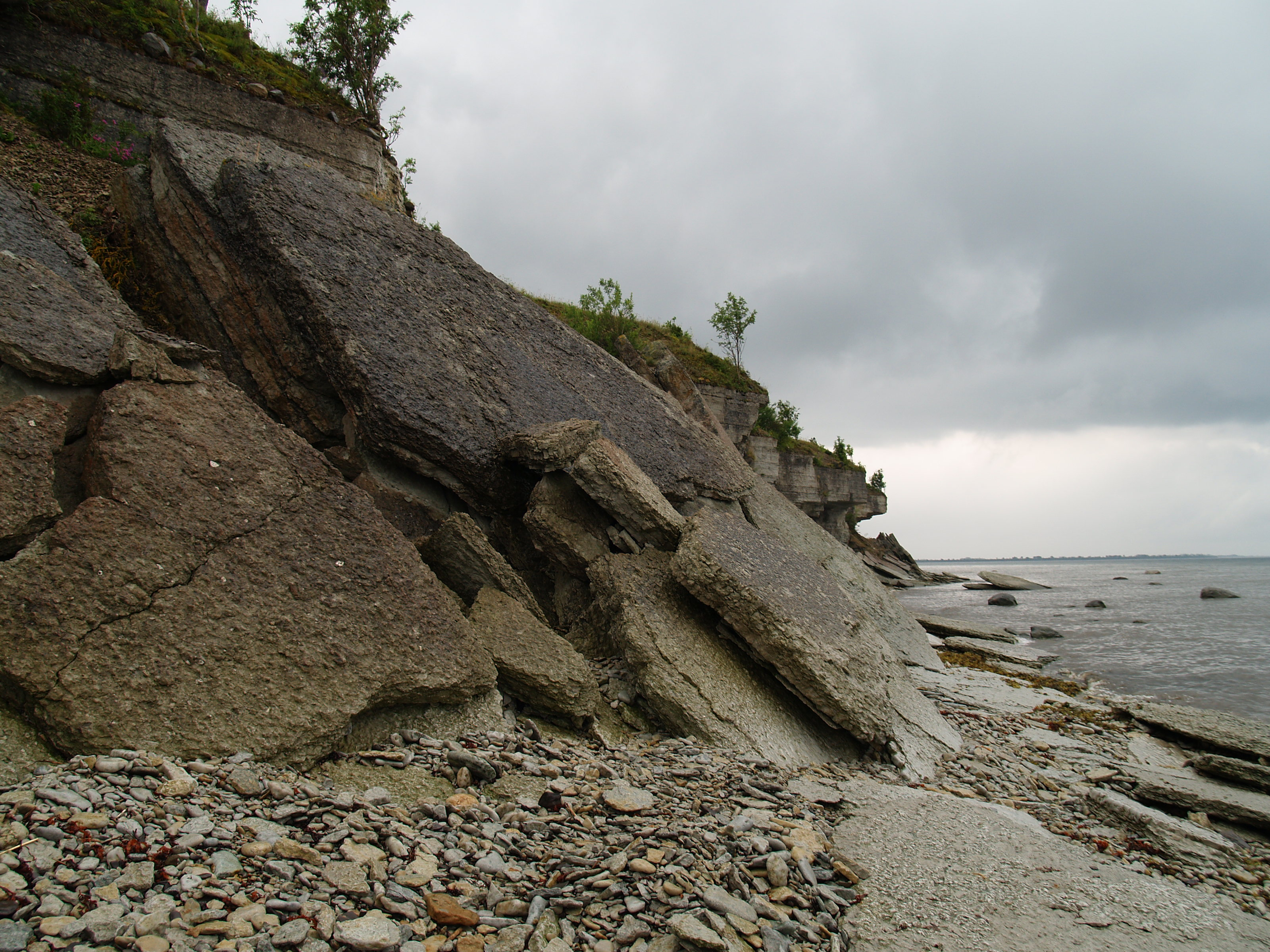
Northern coast of Väike-Pakri.

The islands lie a few kilometers off the Estonian coast. Väike-Pakri lies 3 km west of the town center of Paldiski on the Pakri Peninsula, separated from it by an over 20 m deep bay. The shallow 3 km wide Kurkse strait separates the islands from the mainland in south.

The area of Väike-Pakri, the eastern island, is 12.9 km^{2}, Suur-Pakri covers 11.6 km^{2} (8th and 9th largest islands in Estonia). Väike-Pakri is also higher than Suur-Pakri (17 m and 8 m, respectively). Both islands are about 6 km long (in southeast–northwest direction) and 2-2.5 km wide.

A few islets are situated in the 1-1.5 km wide and shallow (2–4 m deep) strait between the two islands.

A limestone cliff borders the northern coast of both islands and also the eastern coast of Väike-Pakri. Part of the Baltic Klint, it rises up to 4 m on Suur-Pakri and up to 13 m on Väike-Pakri. Both islands are essentially part of a larger limestone plateau in Northern Estonia.

=== Villages ===
Before the Second World War the two islands had 5 villages, three on Suur-Pakri and two on Väike-Pakri.

Suur-Pakri

- Storbyn (Estonian: Suurküla) (100 inhabitants in 1935)
- Strandbyn or Åsbyn (Estonian: Rannaküla) (59)
- Bisagidbyn (Estonian: Lepiku küla) (38)

Väike-Pakri

- Storbyn (Estonian: Suurküla) (88)
- Lillbyn (Estonian: Väikeküla) (72)
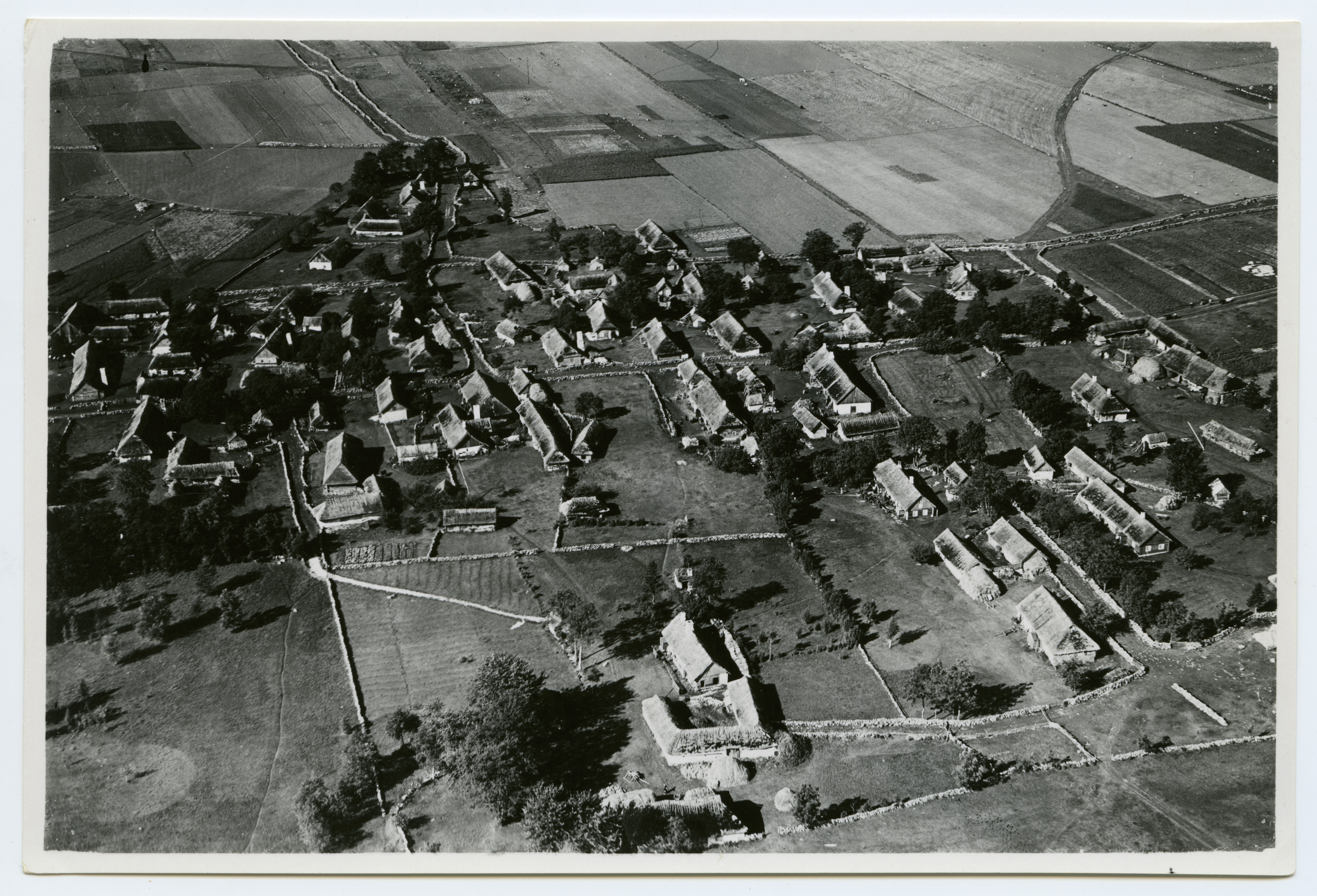
Suurküla (Storby) on Suur-Pakri in 1934

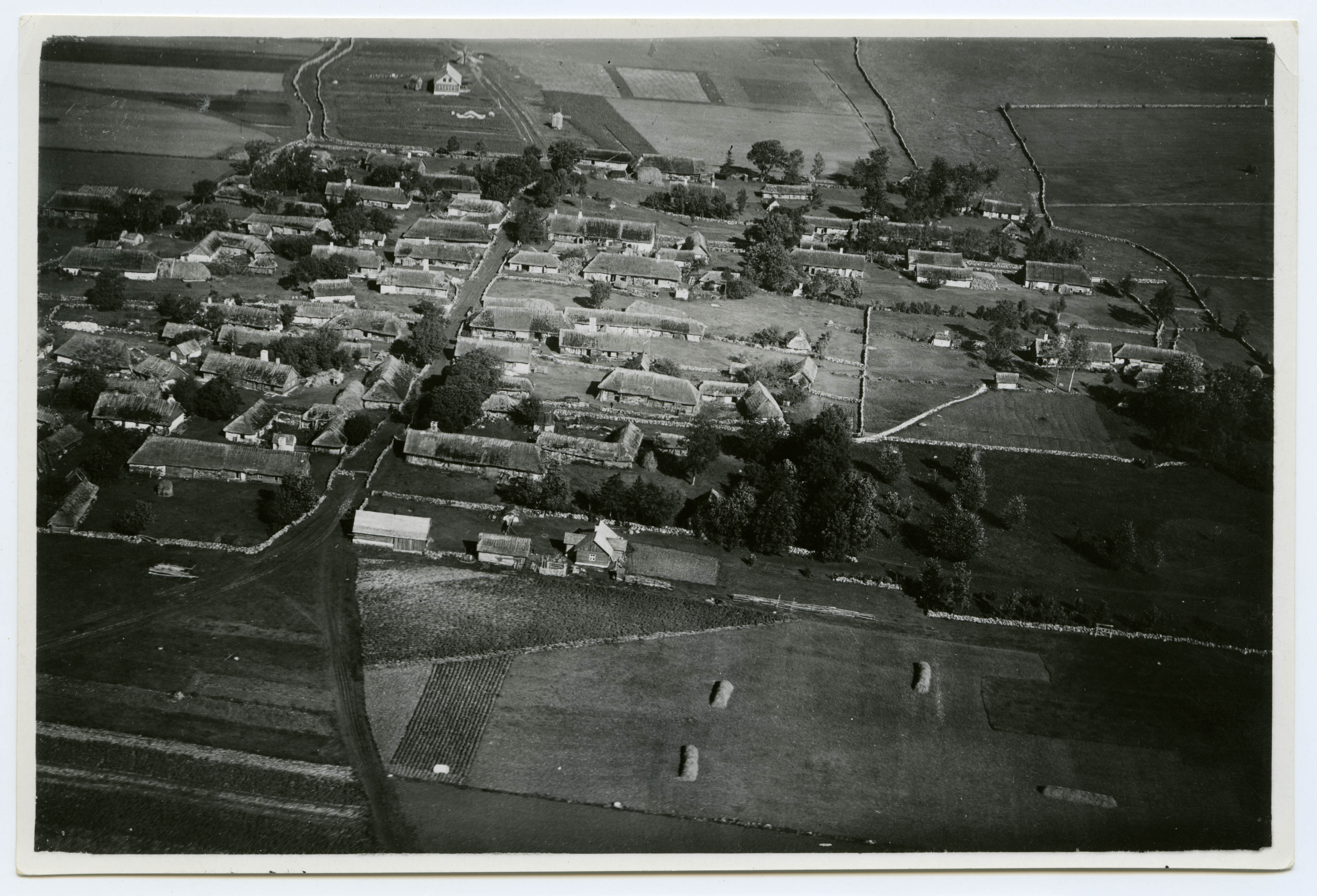
Suurküla (Storby) on Suur-Pakri in 1934

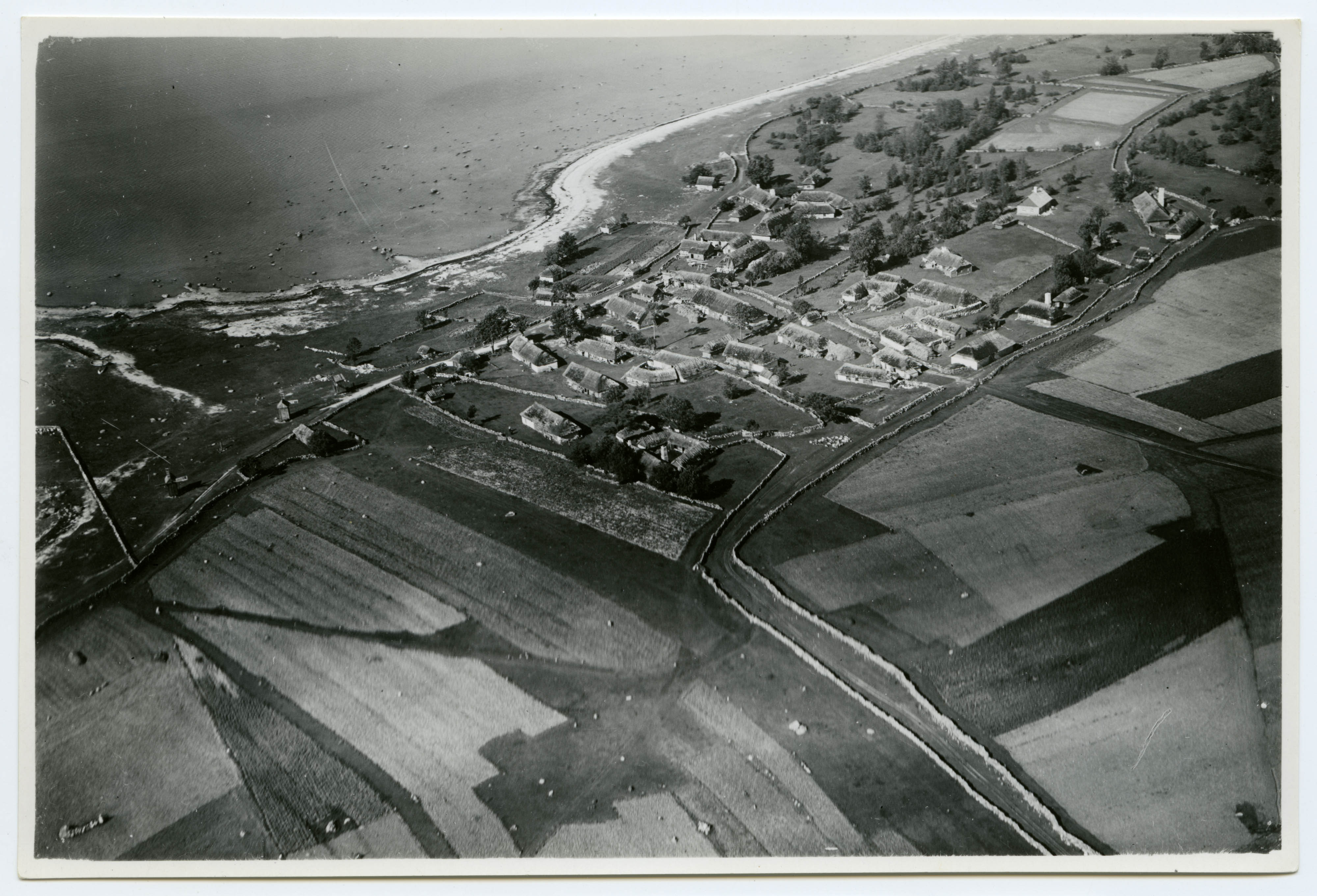
Ranna küla (Åsbyn) on Suur-Pakri in 1934

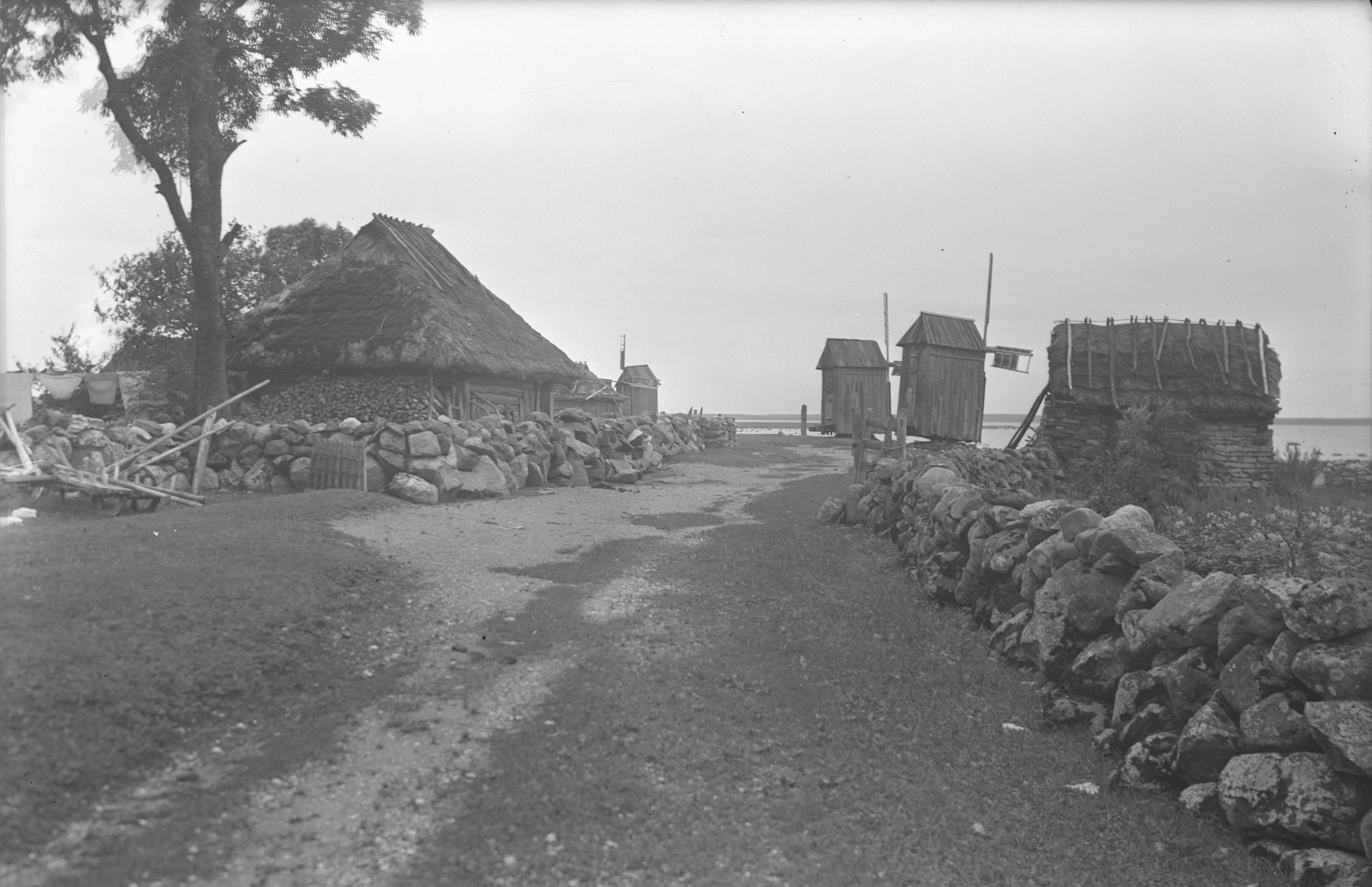
Windmills on Pakri Islands in 1932

== History ==
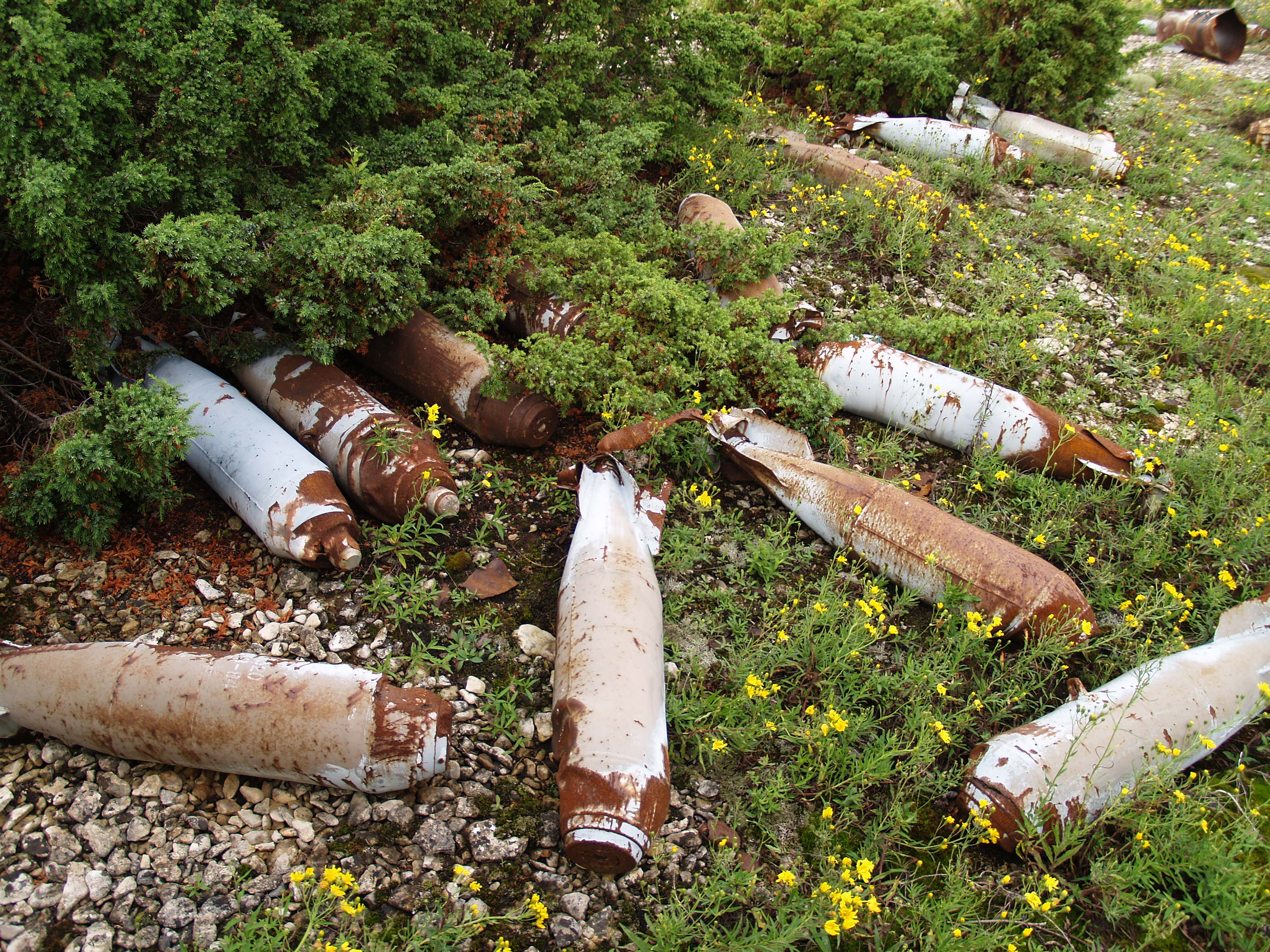
Remains from the time when islands were used as a site for aerial bombardment by Soviet forces.

When the people started to live in the islands, is unknown. In 1345, five Swedish families bought the western island from Padise monastery.

According to the 1934 census in Estonia, the islands had 354 inhabitants, all of them Swedes except for 13 Germans. There were 5 villages, a total of 119 households, a small folk museum (opened in 1935, closed in 1940) and both islands had their own church and school. Suur-Pakri Church is undergoing restoration.

Following the 1939 Nazi–Soviet Pact, the outbreak of World War II, and the Soviet ultimatums to Estonia in September 1939, all of the islanders were soon forced to leave, as the islands became a Soviet military base. Most of the local Swedes left for Sweden before the second Soviet invasion of Estonia in 1944. After World War II, Väike-Pakri had a few civilian inhabitants until 1965.

During the 1944-1991 Soviet occupation of Estonia, the two islands were used as a military proving ground for aerial bombardment. In 1952, the Soviet military built a narrow embankment (consisting of several consecutive rock dams and wooden bridges) to connect the two main islands and some of the islets between them.

After the last Russian military units left the islands in 1994, the Estonian authorities started to clear the area of unexploded ordnance. Thousands of explosive devices were destroyed and the work was mostly completed by 1997.

During the land reform after the 1991 restoration of the independence of Estonia some of the land in the islands was returned to its pre-war owners. The northern parts of the islands and the southern part of Väike-Pakri were incorporated to Pakri Landscape Conservation Area, created in 1998 to protect the limestone cliffs, alvars and rare species. In 2004, the islands got their first permanent inhabitant in decades, when a person born there during the Second World War returned to rebuild his parents' farm. At the end of 2009 the islands had 6 permanent inhabitants.

== Climate ==
Climate data for Pakri Islands (1981–2010)
Month	Jan	Feb	Mar	Apr	May	Jun	Jul	Aug	Sep	Oct	Nov	Dec	Year
Record high °C (°F)	8.8 (47.8)	8.8 (47.8)	14.2 (57.6)	24.2 (75.6)	28.3 (82.9)	30.6 (87.1)	33.5 (92.3)	31.0 (87.8)	26.3 (79.3)	20.5 (68.9)	11.5 (52.7)	10.1 (50.2)	33.5 (92.3)
Mean daily maximum °C (°F)	−0.5 (31.1)	−1.3 (29.7)	2.0 (35.6)	7.8 (46.0)	13.4 (56.1)	17.4 (63.3)	20.9 (69.6)	19.9 (67.8)	15.0 (59.0)	9.7 (49.5)	4.0 (39.2)	1.0 (33.8)	9.1 (48.4)
Daily mean °C (°F)	−2.5 (27.5)	−3.6 (25.5)	−0.7 (30.7)	4.1 (39.4)	9.4 (48.9)	13.8 (56.8)	17.3 (63.1)	16.5 (61.7)	12.0 (53.6)	7.4 (45.3)	2.2 (36.0)	−0.9 (30.4)	6.3 (43.3)
Mean daily minimum °C (°F)	−4.7 (23.5)	−5.9 (21.4)	−3.1 (26.4)	1.2 (34.2)	5.7 (42.3)	10.4 (50.7)	13.9 (57.0)	13.2 (55.8)	9.2 (48.6)	5.0 (41.0)	0.2 (32.4)	−3 (27)	3.5 (38.3)
Record low °C (°F)	−29.7 (−21.5)	−26.3 (−15.3)	−21.2 (−6.2)	−9.8 (14.4)	−3.7 (25.3)	2.1 (35.8)	6.0 (42.8)	5.0 (41.0)	−2.5 (27.5)	−8.4 (16.9)	−17.2 (1.0)	−23.2 (−9.8)	−29.7 (−21.5)
Average precipitation mm (inches)	44 (1.7)	30 (1.2)	31 (1.2)	32 (1.3)	28 (1.1)	52 (2.0)	55 (2.2)	65 (2.6)	59 (2.3)	65 (2.6)	56 (2.2)	52 (2.0)	567 (22.3)
Average precipitation days (≥ 1.0 mm)	12	7	8	8	6	8	8	10	11	11	12	13	114
Average relative humidity (%)	86	85	81	77	75	79	79	80	82	82	85	86	81
Source: Estonian Weather Service (precipitation, 1971–2000)
