= Vladimir Vorobyov =

Russian naval officer

Vladimir Mikhailovich Vorobyov
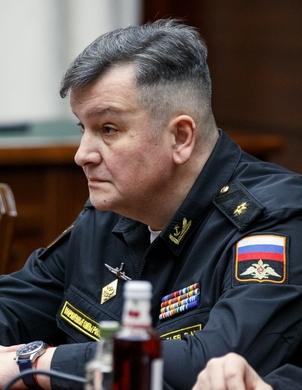
- Born: 6 January 1969 (age 57); Paldiski, Estonian SSR, USSR
- Allegiance: Soviet Union; Russia
- Branch: Soviet Navy; Russian Navy
- Service years: 1985-present
- Rank: Admiral
- Commands: 11th Submarine Division; White Sea Naval Base; Baltic Fleet
- Awards: Order of Alexander Nevsky; Order of Military Merit; Medal of the Order "For Merit to the Fatherland" Second Class

Vladimir Mikhailovich Vorobyov (Russian: Владимир Михайлович Воробьёв; born 6 January 1969) is an officer of the Russian Navy. He currently holds the rank of Admiral, and is a deputy commander in chief of the Russian Navy since 2024.

== Biography ==
Vorobyov was born into a naval family on 6 January 1969 in Paldiski, in what was then the Estonian Soviet Socialist Republic, in the Soviet Union. He entered the Soviet Navy, studying at the Higher Naval School of Submarine Navigation in Leningrad, graduating in 1990. After graduating, he was assigned to the Northern Fleet, where he rose through the ranks and positions over the next 11 years, moving from a lieutenant working as an engineer, to captain 1st rank and command of his own ship. He studied at the Kuznetsov Naval Academy from 2001 to 2003, before returning to the Northern Fleet as a deputy commander. He went on to serve in a number of senior positions between 2003 and 2009, as commander of the 11th Submarine Division, deputy commander of a submarine squadron, chief of staff of the White Sea Naval Base from 2009 until 2010, head of the Northern Fleet's combat training department from 2010 until 2012, and then commander of the White Sea Naval Base between 2012 and 2017. He was promoted to rear admiral on 9 August 2012.

Vorobyov undertook further study at the Military Academy of the General Staff, graduating in 2019 and in July that year being appointed first deputy commander and chief of staff of the Baltic Fleet. He was then appointed first deputy commander and chief of staff of the Northern Fleet in April 2021, before on 5 October 2021 taking up the post of Deputy Chief of the General Staff of the Russian Armed Forces. He was promoted to the rank of vice admiral in February 2023, and on 21 April 2023 he was appointed commander of the Baltic Fleet. He took up his post on 28 April 2023, succeeding Admiral Viktor Liina, who had been appointed commander of the Pacific Fleet. On 8 July 2024, Vorobyov stepped down as commander of the Baltic Fleet to become a deputy commander-in-chief of the Russian Navy. He was promoted to the rank of admiral on 9 December 2024.

== Honours and awards ==
Over his career Vorobyov has received the Order of Alexander Nevsky, the Order of Military Merit, and the Medal of the Order "For Merit to the Fatherland" Second Class and various other medals.
