= Commissioner of Corrective Services (New South Wales) =

Australian state statutory office-holder

- Incumbent; Gary McCahon PSM since 3 March 2025
- Corrective Services NSW
- Style: Commissioner
- Reports to: Minister for Corrections
- Seat: Strawberry Hills, New South Wales
- Nominator: Minister for Corrections
- Appointer: Governor of New South Wales
- Constituting instrument: Crimes (Administration of Sentences) Act 1999 (NSW)
- Precursor: Comptroller-General; Sheriff; Provost Marshal
- Formation: 26 January 1788
- First holder: Henry Brewer

The Commissioner of Corrective Services is a statutory office-holder in the State of New South Wales, Australia, with responsibility for the State's prison, parole and community corrections systems. The Commissioner is Gary McCahon PSM. Between 2009 and 2024, Corrections was a division of the State's justice department, currently known as the Department of Communities and Justice. Prior to 2009 and since 2024, the Commissioner managed their own Department of Corrective Services, known from 1 October 2024 as Corrective Services NSW.

== Previous office-holders ==
Between 1979 and 1988, the Department of Corrective Services was managed by a five-person Corrective Services Commission. This model had been recommended by John Nagle in his royal commission report. From 2009, the Commissioner served as a deputy secretary within the larger Department of Justice. From 1 October 2024, the role of Commissioner became treated identically to Commissioners of other frontline agencies, and is appointed directly by the Minister. Although commissioners have generally been recruited from other professions, both the incumbent and his predecessor began their careers as prison officers.

=== List of Corrective Services Commissioners ===
| Name | Title | Agency | Term start | Term end | Term duration |
|---|---|---|---|---|---|
| Henry Brewer | Provost Marshal | | 26 January 1788 | February 1796 | 8 years, 6 days |
| Thomas Smyth | Provost Marshal | | February 1796 | 20 December 1804 | 8 years, 323 days |
| Garnham Blaxcell | Acting Provost Marshal | | 20 December 1804 | 1 August 1805 | 224 days |
| William Gore | Provost Marshal | | 1 August 1805 | 8 March 1819 | 13 years, 219 days |
| John Thomas Campbell | Provost Marshal | | 8 March 1819 | January 1824 | 4 years, 299 days |
| John Mackaness | Sheriff | Office of the Sheriff | January 1824 | November 1827 | |
| William Carter | Sheriff | Office of the Sheriff | 1828 | 1828 | |
| Thomas Macquoid | Sheriff | Office of the Sheriff | 1829 | 1841 | |
| Adolphus William Young | Sheriff | Office of the Sheriff | 1843 | 1849 | |
| Gilbert Eliot | Sheriff | Office of the Sheriff | 1849 | 1854 | |
| John O'Neill Brenan | Sheriff | Office of the Sheriff | 1855 | 1860 | |
| George Richard Uhr | Sheriff | Office of the Sheriff | 1861 | 1864 | |
| Harold Maclean | Sheriff | Office of the Sheriff | 1864 | 1874 | |
| Harold Maclean | Comptroller-General | Department of Prisons | 1874 | 1889 | 15 years, 0 days |
| George Miller | Comptroller-General | Department of Prisons | 8 January 1890 | 1896 | 5 years, 358 days |
| William Neitenstein | Comptroller-General | Department of Prisons | 22 June 1896 | 17 September 1909 | 13 years, 87 days |
| WM McFarlane | Comptroller-General | Department of Prisons | 1 March 1910 | 29 April 1914 | 4 years, 59 days |
| Samuel McCauley | Comptroller-General | Department of Prisons | 29 April 1914 | 19 December 1919 | 5 years, 234 days |
| Denis Gaynor D'Arcy | Comptroller-General | Department of Prisons | 31 December 1919 | 2 February 1922 | 2 years, 33 days |
| William Urquhart | Comptroller-General | Department of Prisons | 8 February 1922 | 17 May 1925 | 3 years, 98 days |
| HH McDougall | Comptroller-General | Department of Prisons | 17 May 1925 | 24 June 1925 | 38 days |
| George Stole | Comptroller-General | Department of Prisons | 24 June 1925 | 31 December 1927 | 2 years, 190 days |
| William Francis Hinchy | Comptroller-General | Department of Prisons | 3 January 1928 | 31 January 1940 | 12 years, 28 days |
| George F. Murphy | Comptroller-General | Department of Prisons | 31 January 1940 | 31 July 1947 | 7 years, 181 days |
| Leslie Cecil Joshua Nott | Comptroller-General | Department of Prisons | 31 July 1947 | 30 June 1956 | 8 years, 335 days |
| Harold Richard Vagg | Comptroller-General | Department of Prisons | 20 July 1956 | 9 August 1960 | 4 years, 20 days |
| John Arthur Morony | Comptroller-General | Department of Prisons | 9 August 1960 | 14 July 1968 | 7 years, 340 days |
| Walter McGeechan | Comptroller-General | Department of Prisons | 15 July 1968 | 1970 | |
| Walter McGeechan | Commissioner | Department of Corrective Services | 1970 | 18 January 1978 | |
| Leslie Kenneth Downs | Acting Commissioner | Department of Corrective Services | 18 January 1978 | 19 June 1978 | 152 days |
| Leslie Kenneth Downs | Associate Commissioner | Department of Corrective Services | 19 June 1978 | 15 November 1978 | 149 days |
| Noel Stanley Day | Commissioner | Department of Corrective Services | 19 June 1978 | 19 March 1979 | 273 days |
| Dr Phillippe Anthony Vinson | Chairman and Commissioner | Department of Corrective Services | 19 March 1979 | 6 October 1981 | 2 years, 201 days |
| Noel Stanley Day | Deputy Chairman and Commissioner | Department of Corrective Services | 19 March 1979 | 19 March 1986 | 9 years, 143 days |
| Arnold Victor Bailey | Commissioner | Department of Corrective Services | 19 March 1979 | 19 March 1986 | 9 years, 143 days |
| Dr John Henry Temple Ellard | Commissioner (part-time) | Department of Corrective Services | 19 March 1979 | 19 March 1986 | 9 years, 143 days |
| Francis Daniel Hayes | Commissioner (part-time) | Department of Corrective Services | 19 March 1979 | 19 March 1986 | 9 years, 143 days |
| Vern Dalton | Chairman and Commissioner | Department of Corrective Services | 1981 | 22 August 1988 | |
| Stanley Miller | Commissioner (part-time) | Department of Corrective Services | 19 March 1986 | 22 August 1988 | |
| Dr Glenice Kay Hancock | Commissioner | Department of Corrective Services | 1 December 1986 | 22 August 1988 | |
| Dr Susan Carol Hayes | Commissioner (part-time) | Department of Corrective Services | 1 December 1986 | 22 August 1988 | |
| David John Robert Grant | Deputy Chairman and Commissioner | Department of Corrective Services | 27 January 1987 | 22 August 1988 | |
| Noel Stanley Day | Acting Director-General | Department of Corrective Services | 22 August 1988 | 8 March 1989 | |
| Angus Graham | Director-General | Department of Corrective Services | 8 March 1989 | 10 October 1991 | 2 years, 216 days |
| Angus Graham | Commissioner | Department of Corrective Services | 10 October 1991 | | |
| Neville Smethurst AO MBE | Commissioner | Department of Corrective Services | 02 May 1992 | 26 August 1996 | |
| Dr Leo Keliher | Commissioner | Department of Corrective Services | 26 August 1996 | 2002 | |
| Ron Woodham PSM | Commissioner | Department of Corrective Services | 2002 | 2009 | 10 years |
| Ron Woodham | Commissioner | Department of Justice and Attorney General | 2009 | 2012 | 10 years |
| Peter Severin | Commissioner | Department of Attorney General and Justice | 03 September 2012 | 2021 | 9 years |
| Kevin Corcoran PSM | Commissioner | Department of Communities and Justice | 2021 | 2024 | 3 years |
| Leon Taylor | Acting Commissioner | Department of Communities and Justice Corrective Services NSW (from 1 October 2024) | 27 November 2023 | 2 March 2025 | 15 months |
| Gary McCahon PSM | Commissioner | Corrective Services NSW | 3 March 2025 | | |
