= Corrective Services NSW =

Prison operator in New South Wales, Australia

Public Service agency overview
- Formed: 1 October 2024 (as an independent agency)
- Preceding Public Service agency: Department of Communities and Justice (as a division of)
- Type: Agency
- Jurisdiction: Government of New South Wales
- Headquarters: Henry Deane Building, 20 Lee Street, Haymarket, Sydney
- Employees: 10,610 (30 June 2025)
- Annual budget: A$2.2 billion (2022)
- Minister responsible: Anoulack Chanthivong MP, Minister for Corrections
- Public Service agency executive: Gary McCahon PSM, Commissioner
- Key document: https://legislation.nsw.gov.au/view/html/inforce/current/act-1999-093
- Website: https://correctiveservices.dcj.nsw.gov.au/

Corrective Services NSW (CSNSW) is an executive agency of the government of New South Wales, Australia. CSNSW is responsible for the state's prisons and a range of programs for managing released prisoners in the community. The state has 36 prisons, 33 run by CSNSW and three privately operated. The agency traces its origins back to 1788, when New South Wales was founded as a penal colony.

The services provided include correctional centre custody of remand and sentenced inmates, parole, pre-sentence reports and advice to courts and releasing authorities, community service orders and other forms of community-based offender supervision. People in custody and those supervised in the community are assessed for relevant interventions to reduce their risks of re-offending. Corrective Services NSW works in partnership with other government and non-government justice and human services agencies in regard to people in custody and supervised people in the community.

The agency head office is located in the City of Sydney.

== Legislation ==
CSNSW's operations are governed by a number of State laws. The primary legislation which CSNSW operates is the Crimes (Administration of Sentences) Act 1999 (NSW) and its regulation, the Crimes (Administration of Sentences) Regulation 2014 (NSW).

Other relevant pieces of legislation include:

- Crimes Act 1900 (NSW)
- Crimes (Interstate Transfer of Community Based Sentences) Act 2004 (NSW), Crimes (Interstate Transfer of Community Based Sentences) Act 2026 (NSW)
- Crimes (Sentencing Procedure) Act 1999 (NSW)
- International Transfer of Prisoners (New South Wales) Act 1997 (NSW), which assists the International Transfer of Prisoners Act 1997 (Cth)
- Parole Orders (Transfer) Act 1983 (NSW)
- Prisoners (Interstate Transfer) Act 1982 (NSW), Prisoners (Interstate Transfer) Regulation 2024 (NSW)
- Summary Offences Act 1988 (NSW)

== Structure ==
CSNSW is an independent Public Service (executive) agency, headed by Commissioner Gary McCahon PSM, with oversight and direction from the Minister for Corrections, Anoulack Chanthivong. CSNSW is further divided into three divisions each headed by a Deputy Commissioner, further subdivided into sections each headed by an Assistant Commissioner, with the following accurate at 30 October 2025:

- Strategy and Governance (Deputy Commissioner Luke Grant):
  - Delivery, Performance and Culture (Assistant Commissioner Chantal Snell)
  - Strategy and Policy (Assistant Commissioner Jennifer Galouzis)
- Security and Custody (Deputy Commissioner Leon Taylor)
  - Custody Metro (Assistant Commissioner John Buckley ACM)
  - Custody Regional (Assistant Commissioner Craig Smith)
- Community, Industry and Capacity (Deputy Commissioner Dr Anne Marie Martin)
  - Community Corrections (Assistant Commissioner Dr Bernhard Ripperger)
  - Contracts and Commissioning (Assistant Commissioner Craig Mason)
  - Work and Education (Acting Assistant Commissioner Shannon Kay)

CSNSW was formerly a branch of the Department of Communities and Justice, under which the Commissioner would report to the Secretary of the Department, who in turn reported to the Minister.

CSNSW does not administer youth detention centres, which continue to be administered by Youth Justice NSW, as a division of the Department of Communities and Justice.

=== Corrective Services Industries ===
Corrective Services Industries (CSI) is a branch of CSNSW (presumably under the Community, Industry and Capacity division) which operates the prisoner labor programs in NSW prisons, where inmates are required to perform work in various industries.

Some work programs are aimed at reducing the cost of corrective services in NSW, where inmates perform services for the corrective system itself, such as in prison kitchens, laundries, ground and building maintenance and hygiene. Other programs are aimed at education and training of inmates, and others are partnerships with private businesses, producing revenue for CSNSW. In 2016, CSI had $113 million in revenue and earned $45.6 million in profit.

CSI states that its philosophy is rooted in the voluntary employment of inmates in correctional centres, in accordance with Article 22 of the International Labour Organization Constitution, and in 2024/45 CSNSW reported 85.7% of "eligible" inmates were in custody-based employment. Prisoners are deemed not eligible to work for several reasons including if they are unwell, in hospital, elderly, if they are on remand and choose not to work, or if they are located at facilities where the policy is not to provide work or where work is not available. The overall percentage of prisoners working in NSW in 2024/25 was 52.6%, and the way Corrections choose to determine the number of eligible people, such as excluding people who do not have work opportunities provided to them, has been criticised. It is also unclear how many people on remand actively choose not to work, and how many are classified as choosing not to work by default as no work opportunities are available. Capable inmates are legally required to work where directed by the governor of their correctional centre, with a restriction that unsentenced or civil inmates can only be required to keep clean the sections of the correctional centre they personally use.

CSI pays prisoners between $24.60 and $70.55 for a 30-hour work week, significantly less than minimum wage. CSI do not pay prisoners superannuation, nor do they pay payroll tax. Prison workers are not legally considered workers, and as such are not entitled to workers' compensation if injured.

== Facilities ==
Facility	Operator	Security Classification	Opened
Amber Laurel Correctional Centre	CSNSW	Intake and transit facility in Western Sydney	
Bathurst Correctional Complex	CSNSW	Mixed-security facility for males	1888
Broken Hill Correctional Centre	CSNSW	Medium and minimum-security facility for males and females	1892
Cessnock Correctional Complex	CSNSW	Complex houses: Cessnock Correctional Centre – minimum- and medium-security facility for males; Hunter Correctional Centre – maximum-security facility for males; Shortland Correctional Centre – maximum security facility for males	1974
Clarence Correctional Centre, Grafton	Serco	Maximum- and minimum-security correctional centre for male and females	2020
Compulsory Drug Treatment Correctional Centre	CSNSW	Houses participants sentenced to a Compulsory Drug Treatment Order	
Cooma Correctional Centre	CSNSW	Minimum- and medium-security facility	
Emu Plains Correctional Centre	CSNSW	Minimum-security facility for females	
Glen Innes Correctional Centre	CSNSW	Minimum-security facility for males	
Goulburn Correctional Centre	CSNSW	Incorporates two correctional facilities: Goulburn Correctional Centre – Maximum/minimum security institution for males; High Risk Management Correctional Centre – purpose-built maximum-security facility for males	
Francis Greenway Correctional Complex, Berkshire Park (Formerly John Morony Correctional Complex)	CSNSW	Incorporates three correctional facilities: John Morony Correctional Centre, a maximum/medium security correctional centre for remand and sentenced males; Geoffrey Pearce Correctional Centre (formerly Outer Metro Multi Purpose Correctional Centre), a minimum security correctional centre for males; Dillwynia Correctional Centre, a maximum security correctional centre for females	
Junee Correctional Centre	GEO Group	Mixed-security correctional centre for males	
Kariong Correctional Centre	CSNSW	An intake and transit centre for classified inmates transitioning between Sydney and the NSW north coast	
Kirkconnell Correctional Centre	CSNSW	Minimum-security facility for males	
Lithgow Correctional Centre	CSNSW	Maximum-security facility for males	
Long Bay Correctional Complex, Matraville	CSNSW	Incorporates two facilities: Long Bay Hospital – a maximum to minimum security facility for medical and psychiatric cases, and remandees; Metropolitan Special Programs Centre (MSPC) – a maximum/minimum security facility	
Macquarie Correctional Centre	CSNSW	Maximum-security facility for males	
Mannus Correctional Centre	CSNSW	Minimum-security facility for males	
Mary Wade Correctional Centre	CSNSW	Minimum-security facility for males	2017
Mid North Coast Correctional Centre, Kempsey	CSNSW	Maximum-, medium- and minimum- security centre for male and females	2004
Oberon Correctional Centre	CSNSW	Minimum-security facility for males	
Parklea Correctional Centre	MTC/Broadspectrum	Houses remand, minimum- and maximum-security inmates	
Silverwater Correctional Complex, Silverwater	CSNSW	Incorporates three facilities: Silverwater Women's Correctional Centre a maximum security institution for women and the major reception centre for females in NSW.; Metropolitan Remand & Reception Centre (MRRC) a maximum security correctional facility for men; Dawn de Loas Correctional Centre Area 1 & 2 is a minimum security correctional centre for men.	
South Coast Correctional Centre, Nowra	CSNSW	Houses males with minimum, medium and maximum-security areas	2010
St Heliers Correctional Centre	CSNSW	Minimum-security institution for males	
Tamworth Correctional Centre	CSNSW	Medium security facility for males	
Wellington Correctional Centre	CSNSW	Houses maximum security inmates	

== History ==
NSW established jails in Berrima (1836), Cockatoo Island (1839), Darlinghurst (1841), Parramatta (1842), Maitland (1848), Cooma Correctional Centre (1873) and (site of the current Four Seasons hotel located) in The Rocks and later in Goulburn (1884), Bathurst (1888), Broken Hill Correctional Centre (1892) in the state's far west, Long Bay (1909) as the State Reformatory for Women, and Emu Plains (1914). In more recent years, correctional centres (as they are now known) have opened at Parklea (1983), Cessnock, Junee (1993), Lithgow, Silverwater (1997), Brewarrina (2000), John Morony Correctional Centre and Dillwynia Women's Correctional Centre in north-west Sydney, Kempsey (2004), Wellington (2007), and Nowra (2010).

=== Early years (1788–1874) ===
Great Britain started the European settlement of the Colony of New South Wales in 1788, establishing a penal colony at what is now Sydney. The incentive to establishment the colony came from the conclusion (1783) of the American War of Independence, which forced Britain to find ways of dealing with criminals other than transporting them to North America. The initial settlement at Sydney Cove in Port Jackson involved housing convicts in tents, guarded by marines. Further convict shipments followed, and a surge of convicts arrived in Sydney after the Napoleonic Wars ended in 1815. Convicts worked for pay and, where good behaviour was demonstrated, could be assigned to masters. Chain gangs operated from 1826 up until transportation ended in 1840.

In the colony's early years, prisons and executions were managed first by the provost marshal, a military officer, and then, from 1824, by the sheriff.

==== List of provost marshals and sheriffs ====
Name	Title	Appointed by	Term start	Term end	Term duration
Henry Brewer	Provost Marshal	Governor Arthur Phillip	26 January 1788	February 1796	8 years, 6 days
Thomas Smyth	Provost Marshal	Governor John Hunter	February 1796	20 December 1804	8 years, 323 days
Garnham Blaxcell	Acting Provost Marshal	Governor Philip Gidley King	20 December 1804	1 August 1805	224 days
William Gore	Provost Marshal	Colonial Secretary Robert Stewart	1 August 1805	8 March 1819	13 years, 219 days
John Thomas Campbell	Provost Marshal	Governor Lachlan Macquarie	8 March 1819	January 1824	4 years, 299 days
John Mackaness	Sheriff	Colonial Secretary Henry Bathurst	January 1824	November 1827	
William Carter	Sheriff	Attorney-General Alexander Baxter	1828	1828	
Thomas Macquoid	Sheriff	Attorney-General Alexander Baxter	1829	1841	
Adolphus William Young	Sheriff	Attorney-General John Plunkett	1843	1849	
Gilbert Eliot	Sheriff	Attorney-General John Plunkett	1849	1854	
John O'Neill Brenan	Sheriff	Attorney-General John Plunkett	1855	1860	
George Richard Uhr	Sheriff	Attorney-General John Hargrave	1861	1864	
Harold Maclean	Sheriff	Attorney-General James Martin	1864	1874	

=== Departments of Prisons (1874–1970) and Corrective Services (1970–78) ===
The colony established its first Department of Prisons in 1874, with Sheriff Harold Maclean appointed as the first Comptroller-General.

The Department changed its name to 'Corrective Services' in 1970, and McGeechan's title changed to Commissioner. Eight years later, the Wran Government accepted the Royal Commission's recommendation that the post of commissioner be abolished in favour of a three-person Corrective Services Commission.

==== List of comptrollers-general ====
Name	Title	Appointed by	Term start	Term end	Term duration
Harold Maclean	Comptroller-General	Incumbent	1874	1889	15 years, 0 days
George Miller	Comptroller-General	Justice Minister Albert Gould	8 January 1890	1896	5 years, 358 days
William Neitenstein	Comptroller-General	Justice Minister Albert Gould	22 June 1896	17 September 1909	13 years, 87 days
WM McFarlane	Comptroller-General	Justice Minister John Garland	1 March 1910	29 April 1914	4 years, 59 days
Samuel McCauley	Comptroller-General	Justice Minister David Hall	29 April 1914	19 December 1919	5 years, 234 days
Denis Gaynor D'Arcy	Comptroller-General	Justice Minister Jack FitzGerald	31 December 1919	2 February 1922	2 years, 33 days
William Urquhart	Comptroller-General	Justice Minister William McKell	8 February 1922	17 May 1925	3 years, 98 days
HH McDougall	Comptroller-General	Justice Minister Thomas Ley	17 May 1925	24 June 1925	38 days
George Steele	Comptroller-General	Justice Minister William McKell	24 June 1925	31 December 1927	2 years, 190 days
William Francis Hinchy	Comptroller-General	Justice Minister John Lee	3 January 1928	31 January 1940	12 years, 28 days
George F. Murphy	Comptroller-General	Attorney-General Henry Manning	31 January 1940	31 July 1947	7 years, 181 days
Leslie Cecil Joshua Nott	Comptroller-General	Justice Minister Reg Downing	31 July 1947	30 June 1956	8 years, 335 days
Harold Richard Vagg	Comptroller-General	Justice Minister Reg Downing	20 July 1956	9 August 1960	4 years, 20 days
John Arthur Morony	Comptroller-General	Justice Minister Reg Downing	9 August 1960	14 July 1968	7 years, 340 days
Walter McGeechan	Comptroller-General	Attorney-General Ken McCaw	15 July 1968	18 January 1978	9 years, 187 days

=== Post-Nagle Royal Commission (1978–2009) ===
The Government appointed academic Tony Vinson as the chairman of the new Corrective Services Commission. Vinson implemented many of the Royal Commission recommendations, but by 1981 found himself in conflict with the officers' union, the Prison Officer's Vocational Branch (PVOB). The PVOB frequently opposed the Royal Commission recommendations, and a group of prison officers who called themselves the Maggot Squad intimidated and harassed the officers who were supportive of progressive reforms. The Government backed the union in the dispute, and Vinson resigned and went back to working in academia. The tenure of his replacement, Vern Dalton, was memorable for a corruption scandal that saw the Minister for Corrections, Rex Jackson, sentenced to 10 years' jail for corruption.

Labor was defeated at the 1988 New South Wales state election: the Liberal–Nationals coalition that replaced them campaigned on a 'tough on crime' platform. Dalton was moved to a different department and the Corrective Services Commission was abolished in favour of a single director-general on 9 August 1988. The first director-general was former police officer Angus Graham.

In October 1991 the department was restructured, with its juvenile justice responsibilities being transferred to a separate agency and Graham's title changed to Commissioner.

==== List of commissioners and directors-general ====
Name	Title	Appointed by	Term start	Term end	Term duration
Leslie Kenneth Downs	Acting Commissioner	Attorney-General Frank Walker	18 January 1978	19 June 1978	152 days
Leslie Kenneth Downs	Associate Commissioner	Attorney-General Frank Walker	19 June 1978	15 November 1978	149 days
Noel Stanley Day	Commissioner	Attorney-General Frank Walker	19 June 1978	19 March 1979	273 days
Dr Phillippe Anthony Vinson	Chairman and Commissioner	Corrections Minister Bill Haigh	19 March 1979	6 October 1981	2 years, 201 days
Noel Stanley Day	Deputy Chairman and Commissioner	Corrections Minister Bill Haigh	19 March 1979	19 March 1986	9 years, 143 days
Arnold Victor Bailey	Commissioner	Corrections Minister Bill Haigh	19 March 1979	19 March 1986	9 years, 143 days
Dr John Victor Temple Ellard	Commissioner (part-time)	Corrections Minister Bill Haigh	19 March 1979	19 March 1986	9 years, 143 days
Francis Daniel Hayes	Commissioner (part-time)	Corrections Minister Bill Haigh	19 March 1979	19 March 1986	9 years, 143 days
Vern Dalton	Chairman and Commissioner	Corrections Minister Rex Jackson	1981	22 August 1988	
Stanley Miller	Commissioner (part-time)	Corrections Minister John Akister	19 March 1986	22 August 1988	
Dr Glenice Kay Hancock	Commissioner	Corrections Minister John Akister	1 December 1986	22 August 1988	
Dr Susan Carol Hayes	Commissioner (part-time)	Corrections Minister John Akister	1 December 1986	22 August 1988	
David John Robert Grant	Deputy Chairman and Commissioner	Corrections Minister John Akister	27 January 1987	22 August 1988	
Noel Stanley Day	Acting Director-General	Corrections Minister Michael Yabsley	22 August 1988	8 March 1989	
Angus Graham	Director-General	Corrections Minister Michael Yabsley	8 March 1989	10 October 1991	2 years, 216 days
Angus Graham	Commissioner	Justice Minister Terry Griffiths	10 October 1991		
Neville Smethurst	Commissioner			26 August 1996	
Dr Leo Keliher	Commissioner	Attorney-General Jeff Shaw	26 August 1996	2002	
Ron Woodham	Commissioner	Corrections Minister Richard Amery	2002	2009	

=== Corrective Services New South Wales (2009–2024) ===
As part of a broader consolidation of government departments in 2009, the Department of Corrective Services was merged with the departments of the Attorney-General and Juvenile Justice in 2009. Corrective Services New South Wales became a division of what is now known as the Department of Justice, with Woodham retaining his role as Commissioner. Liberal Attorney-General Greg Smith replaced Woodham with Peter Severin, the head of South Australia's prison service, in 2012.

The NSW prison population has doubled in the last two decades, from 7810 inmates in 1998 to 13,722 in 2018. Females account for 8% (1040) of the prisoner population in NSW and 24.7% (3300) of inmates are Aboriginal or Torres Strait Islander. The annual expenditure on prisons in NSW in 2018 was $1.16 billion, and the average cost per prisoner per day is $188.

In terms of performance indicators, in 2018 Corrective Services NSW prisons were below average for Australian states and territories for recidivism (51% at two years), assaults (25 per 100 prisoners), deaths in custody (0.07/100 prisoners), participation in education and training (22%), time out of cells (8 hours/day) and prison capacity utilisation (129%).

In 2019, Corrective Services set a target to reduce adult prison inmate reoffending by 5 per cent by 2023. The prisoner population of NSW is estimated to rise by 550 inmates a year to 16,402 within five years. In response to prisoner number growth, Corrective Services NSW launched a $3.8 billion program for building new prison capacity in 2016.

The Incident Response Team (IRT) is the Riot Squad of Corrective Services NSW. IRT officers are equipped with ballistic vests, helmets with visors, arm and leg guards, capsicum spray, an ASP baton, and flex-cuffs. The grenade launchers issued can fire CS gas or baton rounds.

The Security Operations Group (SOG) is the Corrective Services NSW tactical group. They were formed as the "Emergency Squad," named after the NSW Police Emergency Squad. Long Bay Gaol Emergency Squad were active in riot control at the facility. The group was then renamed the Hostage Rescue Team (HRT) in 2009. HRT did not have riot control responsibilities. HRT's roles were limited hostage rescue until the NSW Police Force Tactical Operations Unit arrived. The team was renamed the Security Operations Group (SOG) The Group's responsibilities include armed escorts of high risk inmates, armed patrols of high security facilities, and responding to armed inmates. SOG are trained to rescue hostages if necessary, although procedure is to cordon and contain for the NSW Police Tactical Operations Unit. SOG operators escort high risk inmates in unmarked, armoured four wheel drives. The main rifle used is the SIG MCX assault rifle. The Heckler and Koch UMP submachinegun is utilized, with the Glock 22 as a sidearm.

==== List of corrective services commissioners ====
Name	Title	Appointed by	Term start	Term end	Term duration
Ron Woodham	Commissioner	Corrections Minister Richard Amery	2002	2012	10 years
Peter Severin	Commissioner	Attorney-General Greg Smith	2012	2021	9 years
Kevin Corcoran PSM	Commissioner	Anthony Roberts, Minister for Counter Terrorism and Corrections	2021	2024	2 years
Leon Taylor	Acting Commissioner	Secretary of the Department of Communities and Justice	27 November 2023	2 March 2025	15 Months

=== Corrective Services NSW (2024–present) ===
Following the Astill Inquiry, formed to inquire into the offending of former correctional officer Wayne Astill at the Dillwynia Women's Correctional Centre, which exposed systemic culture and organisational issues within Corrective Services New South Wales, the Labor Premier Chris Minns announced that the service would be split from the Department of Communities and Justice and become its own executive agency, responsible directly to the Minister for Corrections. The Premier's decision was motivated by desires to create a more "accountable and transparent system". The Premier stated that the move would bring CSNSW in line with frontline agencies such as Fire and Rescue New South Wales.

Name	Title	Appointed By	Term start	Term end	Term duration
Leon Taylor	Acting Commissioner	Secretary of the Department of Communities and Justice (under previous department)	27 November 2023	2 March 2025	15 months
Gary McCahon PSM	Commissioner	Minister for Corrections	3 March 2025		

== See also ==
- Alexander Maconochie Centre
- Commissioner of Corrective Services (New South Wales)
- Department of Communities and Justice
- GEO Group Australia
- Juvenile Justice NSW
- Punishment in Australia
- Serco
- Villawood Immigration Detention Centre
