= Death of David Dungay Jr. =

Aboriginal Australian man who died in custody

David Joseph Dungay Jr was a 26-year-old Aboriginal Australian man who died in New South Wales Corrective Services custody at the Long Bay Correctional Centre on 29 December 2015. His death in custody prompted a coronial inquest which found "systemic deficiencies in training" of corrective services personnel.

== Early life ==
Dungay was born in Kempsey, New South Wales. He was one of two children born to Leetona Dungay and David Hill; he had a younger sister and also had seven half-siblings.

Dungay was a member of the Dunghutti people. with his mother, Leetona Dungay, and his siblings. He was diagnosed with Type 1 diabetes when he was six years old. Dungay was a keen rugby league player as a child, and also had a talent for poetry.

Dungay became involved with the criminal justice system after leaving high school. He was taken into custody in January 2008 and subsequently convicted of three offences – one charge of "robbery in company with wounding" relating to a home invasion that occurred in November 2007 and charges of "attempted sexual intercourse in circumstances of aggravation" and "assault occasioning actual bodily harm" relating to an incident in January 2008. The sexual assault conviction related to the attempted anal rape of a 16-year-old with whom he had an ongoing sexual relationship. The day after the attempted assault occurred, Dungay was observed by police officers punching the victim in the head outside the home of his cousin, leading to the charge of assault occasioning bodily harm. He was found not guilty on a further charge of raping the same person.

Dungay was originally sentenced by the District Court in June 2009, but his sentence was appealed by the prosecution and increased on appeal to the New South Wales Court of Criminal Appeal a total of nine years and six months. He was eligible for parole after five years and six months. He was imprisoned for periods at Mid North Coast Correctional Centre, Junee Correctional Centre, Parklea Correctional Centre, Lithgow Correctional Centre, the Metropolitan Remand and Reception Centre, and the Long Bay Correctional Centre. In June 2013, he was classified as "A2 maximum security" after assaulting a correctional officer at Long Bay's hospital.

== Death in custody ==
In December 2015, Dungay was serving a sentence for assault, aggravated attempted sexual intercourse and party to robbery and was due to be released the following January. On the morning of 29 December, he obtained some biscuits and rice crackers from his belongings and began eating them in his cell when guards ordered him to stop due to his diabetes. After he refused or ignored the orders to stop, several correctional officers entered his cell, restrained him and moved him to another cell so that he could be better observed by a camera. Dungay strenuously resisted the restraints and was injected with the sedative midazolam. Shortly afterwards, while still being restrained, Dungay became unresponsive. Despite immediate administration of CPR by prison officers and health staff, the calling of an ambulance and further efforts to resuscitate him by ambulance paramedics, Dungay did not regain consciousness and was declared dead at 3:42pm.

== Coronial inquest ==
The coronial inquest into Dungay's death began on 16 July 2018. At the inquest, camera footage showed that he was held down and yelled "I can't breathe" multiple times. The commissioner of corrective services, testifying at the inquest, stated that it was a misconception that a restrained person who can talk must be able to breathe. On 22 November 2019, the coroner found none of the guards involved should face disciplinary action and their conduct "was limited by systemic deficiencies in training".

After the findings were announced, Leetona Dungay stated that justice had not been served and their family would seek prosecution of the guards. In June 2021 she said that she intended to lodge a complaint with the UN Human Rights Committee, hoping that it would encourage all levels of government in Australia and other institutions to implement the recommendations of the 1991 Royal Commission into Aboriginal Deaths in Custody. She is being assisted by human rights lawyers Jennifer Robinson and George Newhouse.

== Similarities to George Floyd ==
In the aftermath of the 2020 murder of George Floyd in the United States, new attention was brought to Dungay's story. Floyd had also said "I can't breathe" in his last moments as he was asphyxiated, a phrase which then became internationally associated with the subsequent Black Lives Matter protests. Members of Dungay's family remarked on the similarities and sent their support to Floyd's family. They and numerous commentators also observed that Floyd had become better-known in Australia than Dungay, and that the Australian public should extend their support of black lives to include Indigenous Australians at home.
