= Periodic detention =

Type of judicial punishment

Periodic detention or weekend detention is a type of custodial sentence under which the offender is held in prison between Friday and Sunday evenings each week, but is at liberty at other times. Promoted by prison reformers as an alternative to imprisonment, periodic detention drew praise for allowing offenders to continue working, maintain family relationships, and avoid associating with more dangerous criminals in traditional prisons. It was also considerably less expensive to administer.

== Implementations ==
=== Australia ===
Periodic detention was introduced in the Australian State of New South Wales in 1971 and expanded on the recommendation of the Nagle royal commission. The State's first periodic detention centre operated at the Malabar prison complex. Other centres later opened at Bathurst, Broken Hill, Emu Plains, Silverwater, Tamworth, Tomago and Unanderra. A facility for female offenders, the Norma Parker Periodic Detention Centre, operated at Parramatta. High-profile offenders sentenced to periodic detention included actor Diarmid Heidenreich, investment adviser Rene Rivkin and bookmaker Robbie Waterhouse.

New South Wales ended its periodic detention program in 2010, in favour of non-custodial sentences such as "intensive corrections orders", a form of mandatory community service possibly combined with other conditions such as drug-testing. Under the new system, a conditional non-custodial sentence is imposed. The offender is not detained if conditions are satisfied, but the sentence may be upgraded to full-time custodial detention if the conditions are violated.

The Australian Capital Territory operated a periodic detention centre at Symonston.

=== New Zealand ===
Periodic detention operated in New Zealand between 1962 and 2002, although offenders did not always serve on weekends. High-profile offenders sentenced to periodic detention included former Member of parliament John Kirk. In 2002, periodic detention was combined with community service.

== Criticism ==
Referring specifically to the implementation of periodic detention in New South Wales, Jurist James Wood described such sentences as "a minor inconvenience" for offenders. Although it avoided mixing first-time and petty criminals with more serious offenders, periodic detention nonetheless brought offenders together, potentially reinforcing criminogenic behaviours.

Periodic detention also requires dedicated prisons, periodic detention centres, to be built. Despite these initial costs, periodic detention was over 25% less expensive than its replacement in New South Wales.

== See also ==
- Alternatives to imprisonment
- Community service
- Suspended sentence
- Home detention
