= Macquarie Correctional Centre =

Prison in Australia

- Interactive map of Macquarie Correctional Centre
- Location: Wuuluman, New South Wales, Australia; 32°30′21″S 148°58′54″E
- Status: Operational
- Security class: Maximum (males)
- Capacity: 400
- Opened: 15 December 2017
- Managed by: Corrective Services NSW

Macquarie Correctional Centre, an Australian maximum security prison for males, is located in Wellington, New South Wales, Australia, 360 kilometres (220 mi) west of Sydney. The facility is operated by Corrective Services NSW, an agency of the Department of Communities and Justice, of the Government of New South Wales. The Centre accepts sentenced prisoners under New South Wales and/or Commonwealth legislation.

The facility is made up of 1400 buildings (primarily single storey) and has three hundred layers of fencing. There is more than 5 km of secure fencing and over 16,000 security cameras. The centre was completed in just 54 weeks. It is located next to the larger Wellington Correctional Centre that has 750 beds.

== See also ==
- Punishment in Australia
