= Wellington Correctional Centre =

Prison in New South Wales, Australia

- Interactive map of Wellington Correctional Centre
- Location: Wuuluman, New South Wales, Australia; 32°30′21″S 148°58′54″E
- Status: Operational
- Security class: Minimum to maximum (males and females)
- Capacity: 750
- Opened: 13 September 2007
- Managed by: Corrective Services NSW

Wellington Correctional Centre, an Australian maximum security prison for males and females, is located in Wellington, New South Wales, Australia, 360 kilometres (220 mi) west of Sydney. The facility is operated by Corrective Services NSW, an agency of the NSW Government Department of Communities & Justice. The Centre accepts sentenced and remand prisoners under New South Wales and/or Commonwealth legislation.

The 2021 mouse plague caused the complete evacuation (420 inmates and 200 staff) of the facility in June 2021 as dead mice and damage to infrastructure led to concerns for health and safety of inmates and staff. Female prisoners were moved first, to Bathurst and Broken Hill.

== See also ==
- Punishment in Australia
