= Mannus Correctional Centre =

Australian minimum security prison

- Interactive map of Mannus Correctional Centre
- Location: Tumbarumba, New South Wales; 35.79°S 147.96°E
- Status: Operational
- Security class: Minimum (male); Periodic detention centre (males and females)
- Capacity: 164 (full-time)
- Managed by: Corrective Services NSW

Mannus Correctional Centre, an Australian minimum security prison for males, is located 10 kilometres (6.2 mi) south of Tumbarumba, New South Wales. The centre is operated by Corrective Services NSW an agency of the Department of Communities and Justice of the Government of New South Wales. The centre detains sentenced prisoners under New South Wales and/or Commonwealth legislation.

The centre also serves as a weekend periodic detention centre for both male and female inmates who are employed on community projects.

The centre publishes an anthology of poetry, short stories, songs and photographs of art work by the centre's inmates called Authors and Artists of Mannus. The anthology is currently in its sixth edition as of 2010.

On 2 January 2020, 155 inmates from the Centre were evacuated to the Junee Correctional Centre due to the impending fire front from the Dunns Road fire.

== See also ==
- Punishment in Australia
