= New South Wales Department of Corrective Services =

Australian prison service

The New South Wales Department of Prisons, later the Department of Corrective Services (DCS), was a State government agency in New South Wales, Australia, that managed prisons, parole and community service. Established in 1874 as the Department of Prisons, DCS was absorbed into the State Department of Justice and Attorney General in 2009.

== History ==
=== Before 1874 ===
Great Britain started the European settlement of the Colony of New South Wales in 1788, establishing a penal colony at what is now Sydney. The incentive to establishment the colony came from the conclusion (1783) of the American War of Independence, which forced Britain to find ways of dealing with criminals other than transporting them to North America. The initial settlement at Sydney Cove in Port Jackson involved housing convicts in tents, guarded by marines. Further convict shipments followed, and a surge of convicts arrived in Sydney after the Napoleonic Wars ended in 1815. Convicts worked for pay and, where good behaviour was demonstrated, could be assigned to masters. Chain gangs operated from 1826 up until transportation ended in 1840.

In the colony's early years, prisons and executions were managed first by the provost marshal, a military officer, and then, from 1824, by the sheriff.

=== Department of Prisons ===
The colony established its first Department of Prisons in 1874, with Sheriff Harold Maclean appointed as the first Comptroller-General.

=== Department of Corrective Services ===
The department changed its name to 'Corrective Services' in 1970, and McGeechan's title changed to Commissioner. Eight years later, the Wran Government accepted the Royal Commission's recommendation that the post of commissioner be abolished in favour of a three-person Corrective Services Commission.

The Government appointed academic Tony Vinson as the chairman of the new Corrective Services Commission. Vinson implemented many of the Royal Commission recommendations, but by 1981 found himself in conflict with the officers' union, the Public Service Association. The Government backed the union in the dispute, and Vinson retired to academia. The tenure of his replacement, Vern Dalton, was memorable for a corruption scandal that saw the Minister for Corrections, Rex Jackson, sentenced to 10 years' gaol for corruption.

Labor, tarnished by this and other scandals, was swept from office in 1988: the Liberal–Nationals coalition that replaced them campaigned on a 'tough on crime' platform. Dalton was moved to a different department and the Corrective Services Commission was abolished in favour of a single director-general on 9 August 1988. The first director-general was former police officer Angus Graham.

In October 1991 the department was restructured, with its juvenile justice responsibilities being transferred to a separate agency and Graham's title changed to Commissioner.

As part of a broader consolidation of government departments in 2009, the Department of Corrective Services was merged with the departments of the Attorney-General and Juvenile Justice in 2009. Corrective Services New South Wales became a division of what is now known as the Department of Communities and Justice, with Woodham retaining his role as Commissioner.

== Past chief executives ==
List of past Commissioners for New South Wales

== See also ==
- New South Wales Department of Justice
- New South Wales Department of Communities and Justice
- Royal Commission into New South Wales Prisons
- Punishment in Australia
- List of prisons in Australia
- GEO Group
- Management and Training Corporation
- Serco
