= Glen Innes Correctional Centre =

Australian minimum security prison in New South Wales

- Interactive map of Glen Innes Correctional Centre
- Location: Glen Innes, New South Wales; 29.641667°S 152.09999°E
- Status: Operational
- Security class: Minimum (male)
- Capacity: 165
- Opened: 15 August 1928 (as Mount Mitchell Afforestation Camp)
- Managed by: Corrective Services NSW

The Glen Innes Correctional Centre, an Australian minimum security prison for males, is located 45 kilometres (28 mi) on the Gwydir Highway, near Glen Innes, New South Wales. The centre is operated by Corrective Services NSW an agency of the Department of Communities and Justice of the Government of New South Wales. The centre detains sentenced prisoners under New South Wales and/or Commonwealth legislation and is a pre-release centre to prepare inmates for release to the community.

== History ==
Established as the Mount Mitchell Afforestation Camp on 15 August 1928, the facility has also been known as Glen Innes Afforestation camp, and now the Glen Innes Correctional Centre. Between 1928 and 1950 the site was used only for trustworthy, honest prisoners. In 1966 the site was expanded with an additional 35 huts added to the facility. By the mid-1970s, the site accommodated 165 prisoners.

Current employment opportunities for Inmates:

1) Firewood Packing & Packaging, 2) Aboriginal Demountable Housing construction, 3) Food Services and Laundry and 4) Ground Maintainace.

== Notable prisoners ==
- Danny Wicks – Australian professional rugby league footballer who served an eighteen-month prison sentence for trafficking drugs.

== See also ==
- Punishment in Australia
