= Department of Community Services (New South Wales) =

Former Australian government agency

The New South Wales Department of Community Services, commonly known as DoCS, was a State government agency in New South Wales, Australia, that provided child welfare services from 1881 until its abolition in 2009. In that year, DoCS was absorbed into the new Department of Human Services (later the Department of Family and Community Services).

The department operated as the:

- State Children Relief Department (1881–1923)
- Child Welfare Department (1923–1970)
- Department of Child Welfare and Social Welfare (1970–1973)
- Youth and Community Services (1973–1975)
- Youth, Ethnic and Community Affairs (1975–1976)
- Youth and Community Services (1976–1988)
- Department of Family and Community Services (1988–1992)
- Department of Community Services (1992–2009).

== See also ==
- Department of Juvenile Justice (1991–2009)
- Department of Family and Community Services (2009–2019)
- Department of Communities and Justice
