= Kirkconnell =

Kirkconnell or Kirkconnel may refer to:

- Kirkconnel, a town in Scotland
- Kirkconnel railway station, a mainline railway station in Kirkconnel, Scotland
- Kirkconnell Correctional Centre, a prison in New South Wales, Australia
- Moses Kirkconnell, Caymanian politician
- Watson Kirkconnell (1895–1977), Canadian scholar, university administrator and translator
