= Royal Commission into New South Wales Prisons =

- Date: March 31, 1976 – March 31, 1978
- Duration: 2 years
- Location: Sydney, Australia
- Also known as: Nagle Royal Commission
- Commissioner: John Flood Nagle
- Counsel Assisting: David Hunt
- Consultants: Sydney Derwent; Alexander Mitchell; Sir Leon Radzinowicz

The Royal Commission into New South Wales Prisons, also known as the Nagle Royal Commission, was established in 1976 to inquire into the management of prisons in the State of New South Wales, Australia. The commission was headed by Supreme Court Justice John Flood Nagle. Nagle's report, handed down in 1978, described "an inefficient Department administering antiquated and disgraceful gaols; untrained and sometimes ignorant prison officers, resentful, intransigent and incapable of performing their tasks." The first of the Royal Commission's 252 recommendations was the dismissal of Corrective Services Commissioner Walter McGeechan – though the Government sacked McGeechan three months before receiving Nagle's final report.

== Background ==
As Nagle noted in his report, the Royal Commission was by no means the first inquiry into the state of New South Wales prisons. An 1861 select committee, an 1878 Royal Commission, a 1946 committee and a 1973 working party had each produced recommendations that had yet to be fully implemented. Yet despite the deplorable conditions these inquiries had uncovered, public support for the prison system remained strong. A McNair Anderson opinion poll conducted in 1976 found that 40 per cent of NSW residents felt prison conditions were "about what they should be"; a further 29 per cent thought they were "too lenient".

=== Grafton ===
Grafton Gaol was designated as a centre for 'intractable' male inmates in 1942. Officers serving at Grafton were entitled to a curiously named "climatic allowance", intended to attract "capable, tactful and robust" men and compensate them for the "arduous nature" of their work. As Nagle was to sensationally uncover, this ardour derived from the frequent and illegal beatings meted out to inmates. This began when the prisoner arrived with a "reception biff" and continued throughout the man's sentence whenever he was thought to breach "written or unwritten rules". One such rule was that inmates were forbidden to make eye contact with staff.

The abuses at Grafton continued undetected for some 30 years, but by the 1970s the prison had acquired a reputation for brutality and questions began to be asked in Parliament and the media. Corrective Services changed its approach to managing the so-called intractables, opening the 40-bed Katingal Special Security Unit at Long Bay in 1975. Katingal replaced a regime of violence with what amounted to sensory deprivation.

=== Bathurst ===
But it was events at the much larger Bathurst Gaol that were to force the brutal world of the State's penal system into the public consciousness. In February 1974, an inmate threw a petrol bomb into the prison chapel, sparking a riot. Officers responded with gunfire and, having regained control of the prison, proceeded to inflict retaliatory beatings on the inmates. More than 50 inmates were injured during the riot and its aftermath, and one was paralysed by a bullet lodged in his spine.

In his report, Nagle noted that the Superintendent at Bathurst had also led reprisal beatings against protesting prisoners in 1970. The Department had been aware of the assaults at the time, but had determined that there was insufficient evidence to discipline any individual officer. Like every one of his counterparts, the Superintendent had also failed to act on a Departmental requirement that all prisons have a plan in place for dealing with riots.

== Establishment ==
Following the second Bathurst riot, the Liberal Premier, Sir Robert Askin, promised an inquiry – but this was deferred pending the outcome of criminal charges against the rioters. On 31 March 1976, Askin's successor, Eric Willis established the promised royal commission, with Supreme Court justice John Flood Nagle presiding. Former Macquarie University vice-chancellor Alexander Mitchell and University of New South Wales academic Sydney Derwent were appointed as members of the commission, with Cambridge criminologist Sir Leon Radzinowicz serving as a consultant.

The commissioners were directed to "inquire into and report upon the general working of the Department of Corrective Services of New South Wales, its policies, facilities and practices in the light of contemporary penal practice and knowledge of crime and its causes." They were asked to specifically consider the relationship between staff and prisoners, as well as the selection and training of prison officers, and to provide recommendations for legislative change. The commissioners initiated preliminary hearings two weeks later.

The Liberals lost power in May 1976, and the new Labor government of Neville Wran sought to put its ideological stamp on the commission. Although Wran did not amend the terms of reference, Mitchell and Derwent were demoted to consultant roles, and Radzinowicz – considered too conservative – was sacked. Nagle continued on as sole commissioner. The Liberal Opposition accused Wran of trying to nobble the inquiry; prisoners' advocates saw it as cost-cutting.

== Conduct of the inquiry ==
Nagle sought written submissions from the Department; the prison officers' union, the Public Service Association (PSA); current and former inmates; and members of the public.

Hearings were conducted in an adversarial manner, with Counsel Assisting the commission, David Hunt, examining Departmental staff, current and former inmates, and other witnesses. Both the Department and, were represented by counsel at the commission's hearings. Five civil-society groups were also given leave to appear: the Council for Civil Liberties, the Penal Reform Council, the Aboriginal Legal Service, Women Behind Bars and the Prisoners Action Group. Prisoners were represented by two lawyers, Merv Rutherford and I.L. Dodd.

For the first 10 months, the commission's hearings focused almost exclusively on Bathurst. Prisoners, prison officers, departmental officials and the PSA all testified. On 1 February 1977, Nagle indicated that future hearings would consider other matters. These included violence at Grafton Gaol, the role of Long Bay's Katingal unit, and allegations of inappropriate behaviour by officers at Goulburn and Milson Island.

The commission also considered more general issues of policy: management, staff conditions, external oversight, classification, security measures, inmate work assignments, education programs, remissions, probation and parole, sentencing, record-keeping, public relations, research, and planning. Prison conditions were also examined at some length, including the particular challenges faced by female, Aboriginal and non-English-speaking inmates.

Nagle conceded that "grave allegations" of illegal use of force at Long Bay and Maitland gaols had not been explored by the commission. Rather, having already uncovered "clear illustrations" that the Department and its officers were using force illegally, he recommended that individual complaints from inmates be referred to an individual appointed for the purpose. (This recommendation was rejected.)

== Findings ==
Nagle presented his report to the Governor, Sir Roden Cutler, on 31 March 1978. Its 630 pages excoriated "an inefficient Department administering antiquated and disgraceful gaols; untrained and sometimes ignorant prison officers, resentful, intransigent and incapable of performing their tasks." The report catalogued poor conditions across the State's prison system, with a particular focus on the events at Bathurst and Grafton. The document also contained an extensive review of the literature on criminology and prison administration. In setting out an agenda for reform, Nagle articulated five principles:

1. "the loss of liberty is the extent of the punishment"
2. "the inmate should lose only his liberty and such rights as expressly or by necessary implication result from the loss of that liberty"
3. imprisonment should only be used as a last resort
4. those who are gaoled should remain there for as short a time as possible
5. inmates should be housed in the "lowest appropriate" security classification.

=== Key recommendations ===
In all, Nagle made more than 250 general recommendations, of which he considered seven most important:

- dismissal of Commissioner Walter McGeechan, who had "knowingly presided over a system that condoned the illegal use of force on prisoners"
- a board of Commissioners should be appointed to replace McGeechan
- the selection and training of all ranks of Corrective Services should be improved, including by appointing some senior officers from outside the agency
- giving Superintendents primary responsibility for the order and good governance of their prisons
- more frequent consultation with the Public Service Association and other trade unions
- the public should be better informed about the prison system
- a 20-year building plan should be developed in order to progressively replace older facilities.

=== Other recommendations ===
The other recommendations included:

- clear rules around the appropriate use of force
- increased salaries for officers
- removing gender barriers to employment in male and female prisons
- an independent prisons inspectorate
- inmates should be classified on the basis of security considerations only
- electronic equipment should be used to improve security
- contact visits should be allowed in all prisons
- monitoring of visits should cease
- censorship of inmates' mail should cease
- food, libraries, clothing, sporting facilities and outdoor shelter should be improved
- female inmates should be housed in cells, not dormitories
- judges should be able to set non-parole periods for life sentences
- pre-release and after-care programs should be improved
- imprisonment of fine defaulters should cease
- courts should be empowered to impose community service obligations in lieu of imprisonment
- a new high-rise remand centre should be built close to the City courts.

== Impact ==
Tony Vinson, who replaced McGeechan as head of the Department of Corrective Services, remarked that prison administrators the world over "invariably know of and allude to the Nagle Report as an important benchmark."

=== Law reform ===
NSW was undergoing a period of rapid social liberalisation around the time of Nagle's commission. Vice offences, which had earlier contributed significantly to the prison population, were being punished less severely – or not at all. Under Askin, restrictions on off-track betting had begun to be relaxed with the spread of government-owned totalisator agencies, and a 1971 court decision had effectively legalised abortion. Wran liberalised laws on prostitution, public intoxication, vagrancy and homosexuality. His Government also ended the practice of gaoling fine defaulters.

Nagle argued for an expansion in the use of periodic detention, a recommendation that was accepted. (The practice was abandoned in 2010.)

=== Personnel ===
Unimpressed by McGeechan's performance in the witness box, Nagle had intended to make his first recommendation that the Commissioner be dismissed. The Government was unwilling to wait for Nagle's report, however, and sacked McGeechan on 18 January 1978, three months before Nagle published his recommendations. While acknowledging that the dismissal had already occurred, Nagle let his first recommendation stand. McGeechan had served nine and a half years at the helm of the State's prison system. For the next year, the Department was led first by Department of Justice Secretary Les Downs, then Assistant Commissioner Noel Day.

The Government accepted Nagle's view that the Department was too complex to be run by a single individual, and took up his suggestion of a five-person commission. On 19 March 1979, it appointed Vinson as chief commissioner alongside Day, Arnold Bailey, Dr John Ellard and Frank Hayes. Vinson resigned less than three years later, forced out by union opposition to his reforms and a lack of support from the Wran Government. Within 10 years, the five-person commission had been abandoned in favour of a single commissioner once more.

Though he went to some trouble to excoriate McGeechan, Nagle was more forgiving of his subordinates. The report named dozens of officers implicated in violence, dishonesty, corruption and incompetence. Of the union's excuse that its members were simply following orders, the Royal Commissioner thundered "The defence did not succeed in the Nuremberg Trials; it does not succeed here."

Yet there were no recommendations for prosecution or dismissal of officers – with one exception. An officer at Goulburn, Keith Newling, stood accused of making homosexual advances towards a prisoner. Nagle recommended that he face disciplinary action, a recommendation that was accepted. Of the others, including the men who committed the assaults at Bathurst and Grafton, Nagle wrote that he saw "no purpose at this late stage of recommending criminal prosecutions."

=== Infrastructure ===
Though he did not accept the Department's estimate that the prison population would grow considerably, Nagle nonetheless threw his support behind a number of construction projects then under consideration. His view was that a newly built prison could be used to decant one of the older gaols, allowing for its upgrade.

Nagle called for the Department to take over the Cumberland Hospital site at North Parramatta, and to proceed with a major expansion of the Bathurst complex. The first of these plans never eventuated; the Government closed Parramatta Gaol altogether in 1999, although the nearby former Parramatta Girls Home was converted for use as a women's prison, the Norma Parker Centre, before closing in 2008. Work to expand Bathurst did not begin until 2018 – a lag of 40 years. Nagle's call for a new high-rise remand centre in central Sydney went unheeded.

Katingal, the special unit at Long Bay which had replaced Grafton as the last stop for high-risk inmates only in 1975, was closed on Nagle's recommendation. The building itself remained empty for many years before being demolished in 2004.

The first new prison to be built following the Nagle report was Parklea Correctional Centre, completed in 1983. Though designed to honour the commission's findings, it too was plagued by problems.
