= Kirkconnell Correctional Centre =

Prison in New South Wales, Australia

- Interactive map of Kirkconnell Correctional Centre
- Location: Sunny Corner, near Bathurst, New South Wales; 33°25′02″S 149°50′30″E
- Status: Operational
- Security class: Minimum (males only)
- Capacity: 260
- Opened: 26 November 1958; 30 July 2015 (reopening)
- Closed: December 2011
- Managed by: Corrective Services NSW

Kirkconnell Correctional Centre, an Australian minimum security prison for males, is located 30 kilometres (19 mi) east of Bathurst, New South Wales.

The Centre is located in the Sunny Corner State Forest and has a fully trained bushfire fighting team comprising both prison staff and inmates.

It was declared a prison under the name "Kirkconnell Afforestation Camp" on 26 November 1958. In September 2011 it was reported that Corrective Services NSW will close the facility in December 2011, as a cost saving measure. All of inmates were relocated to the minimum security wings at Bathurst Correctional Centre and Long Bay. The facility was reopened on 30 July 2015, after a 4 million dollar upgrade.

== Notable prisoners ==
- Rodney Adler – disgraced businessman
- Roger Rogerson
- Nicole Louise Pearce (birth name Paul Wayne Luckman), convicted murderer
- Eddie Obeid, former NSW labor party politician

== See also ==
- Punishment in Australia
