= Mouse plagues in Australia =

Environmental issue in Australia

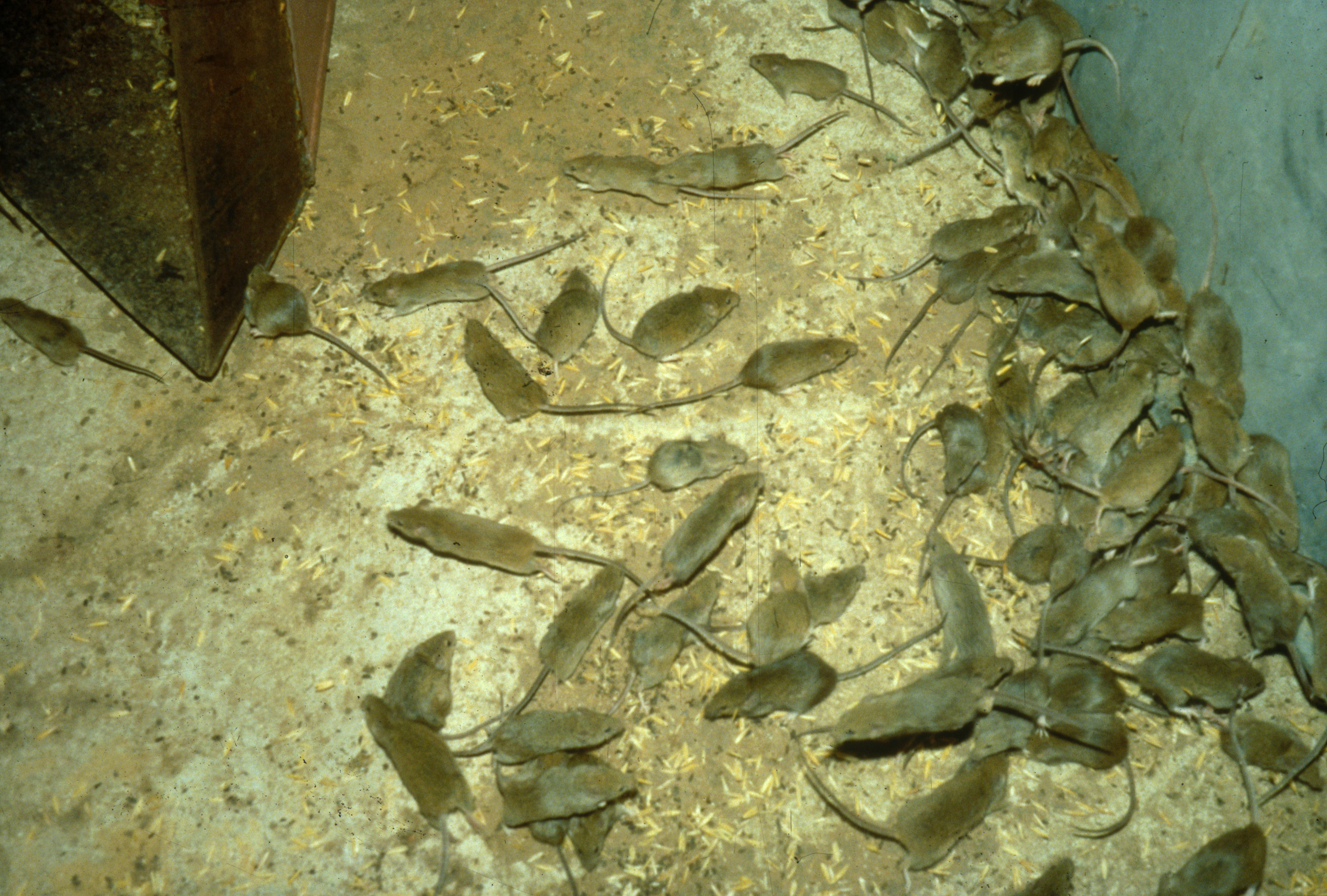
House mice in the Darling Downs 2004

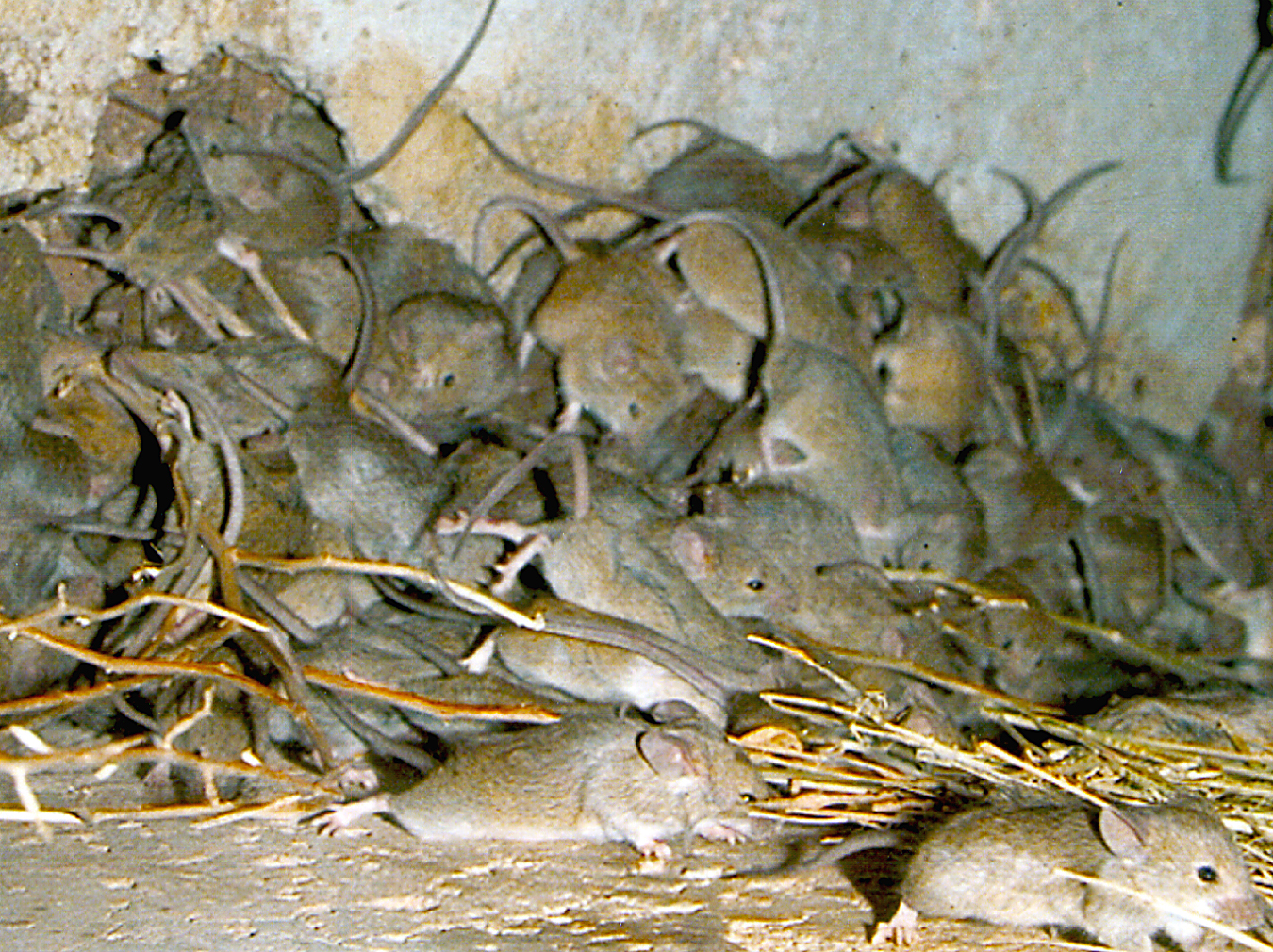
Mouse plague 2007

Mouse plagues have occurred several times throughout parts of Australia since wild house mice (Mus musculus) were introduced by European colonists along with the First Fleet in 1788. Australia and China are the two countries in the world where plagues of mice are known to occur.

Mouse plagues occur in southern and eastern Australia, usually in the grain-growing regions, around every four years. Aggregating around food sources during plagues, mice can reach a density of up to 3,000 per hectare (1,200/acre). During a severe plague in 2026, the CSIRO estimated densities of up to 8,000 per hectare (3,200/acre).

== History ==
=== Early mice plagues ===
Mice probably arrived in Australia as stowaways on board the First Fleet of British colonists in 1788. An early localised plague of mice occurred around Walgett in New South Wales in 1871. In 1872 another plague was recorded near Saddleworth in South Australia with farmers ploughing the soil to destroy mouse nests.

=== 1880s and 1890s ===
In 1880 a plague of mice was noted along an area of the Goulburn River.

South Australia experienced another plague in 1890 in the Mid North region in areas around Oladdie, Mundoora and Georgetown.

=== 1900s and 1910s ===
In 1904, further plagues occurred in parts of New South Wales including Condobolin and other parts of the Lachlan River and around Moree, New South Wales extending all the way to coastal areas.

The plague of 1917 was one of the largest mouse plagues in Australia that occurred on and around the Darling Downs area of Queensland, areas around Beulah, Campbells Creek and Willenabrina in Victoria and parts of South Australia including Balaklava. Eventually mice reached the Goldfields-Esperance and Wheatbelt regions of Western Australia.

Plagues of mice have been occurring ever since with increasing frequency.

More incidences of plagues occurred in 1918 in parts of Victoria and New South Wales.

=== 1920s and 1930s ===
In 1922 areas around Dubbo, New South Wales and Tamworth in New South Wales were hit again followed by more plagues through the Riverina in 1925.

Mice struck again in 1928 in parts of Queensland around Warwick.

Further plagues occurred around Wimmera in Victoria, Loxton in South Australia and Winton in Queensland in 1931 and more were recorded in parts of New South Wales in 1932 including Culgoa and Parkes. The next plague hit areas around Warracknabeal and Hopetoun in Victoria but was less intense than the 1932 plagues.

=== 1950s and 1960s ===
In 1952, parts of Victoria and South Australia were struck by mouse plagues.

Areas in New South Wales and Queensland were hit by mouse plagues in 1955. In 1956 parts of the Eyre Peninsula in South Australia experienced the worst mouse plague the area had known.

Parts of outback New South Wales around Bourke were hit by plagues of mice in 1967.

=== 1970s and 1980s ===
In 1972, parts of Queensland were hit by mouse plagues as were parts of Victoria and New South Wales in 1975.

A plague in Victoria in 1979 cost farmers A$15 million in lost crops and damaged machinery. The plagues continued into 1980.

=== 1990s and 2000s ===
Another plague occurred in 1994 affecting parts of New South Wales, the Australian Capital Territory, South Australia and northern Victoria.

Australia's worst ever mouse plague occurred in 1993 and caused an estimated A$96 million worth of damage to crops and attacked livestock in piggeries and poultry farms. They also destroyed rubber and electrical insulation, damaged farm vehicles, and ruined cars and buildings.

=== 2000s–present ===
Mouse numbers built to plague numbers in early 2011 in southern Queensland, through New South Wales, western Victoria and South Australia spreading to the Nullarbor Plain region of Western Australia in late 2011.

A mouse plague affecting parts of Queensland and New South Wales began in mid-2020 and continued into 2021. Co-occurring with the COVID-19 pandemic, mice were initially not susceptible but researchers showed that a type of mutation called aromatic substitution in position 501 or position 498 (but not both) in the SARS-CoV-2 virus spike protein would adapt the novel Coronavirus to mice.

In January 2021, the mice continued to cause problems, and raised concerns for crops in areas of New South Wales and Queensland. In March 2021, mice were stripping food and other items from the shelves of a supermarket in Gulargambone (382 km (237 mi) north west of Sydney). Health concerns for people were raised when mice killed by baits were found in drinking water tanks. Trundle and Tottenham have also been affected. In May 2021, the Central West town of Canowindra and residents were featured in a CNN report on the phenomena. In the meantime, mice were chewing through walls and ceilings, and were estimated to have caused $100 million in damage to crops and grain stores. Homeowners setting traps were reporting catching 500 to 600 mice per night. The plague caused the complete evacuation (420 inmates and 200 staff) of the Wellington Correctional Centre in June 2021 as dead mice and damage to infrastructure led to concerns for health and safety of inmates and staff.

In 2026, Western Australia was inundated by the most severe plague in living memory, with densities estimated as high as 8,000 per hectare (3,200/acre)

== See also ==
- Rabbit plagues in Australia
- Mautam, rat plague in India
