= Department of Juvenile Justice (New South Wales) =

NSW government department overseeing prisons

The New South Wales Department of Juvenile Justice, known between 1991 and 1993 as the Office of Juvenile Justice, was a state government agency in New South Wales, Australia, that managed juvenile detention centres and other aspects of the youth justice system.

== Formation ==
Responsibility for children convicted of crimes was removed from the former Child Welfare Department and placed within the Department of Corrective Services in July 1991. Five months later, an independent Office of Juvenile Justice was established.

== Locations ==
The department operated 34 Juvenile Justice Community Services offices and seven Juvenile Justice Centres, located as follows:

Centre name	Location	Date opened	Purpose	Notes
Acmena Juvenile Justice Centre	Grafton, Mid North Coast	September 1999	Capacity for 45 young people; male detainees only	
Cobham Juvenile Justice Centre	Werrington, Western Sydney	June 1980	Capacity for 105 young people; the principal remand centre for males aged 15 years and over	
Frank Baxter Juvenile Justice Centre	Kariong, Central Coast	October 1999	Capacity for 120 young people; accommodates males aged 16 to 21 years, mostly on control orders	
Juniperina Juvenile Justice Centre	Lidcombe, Western Sydney	24 August 2005	Capacity for 44 young people; the only Australian centre for female juveniles	
Orana Juvenile Justice Centre	Dubbo, Western New South Wales	December 1999	Capacity for 30 young people; accommodates males on remand or control orders	
Reiby Juvenile Justice Centre	Airds, South Western Sydney	August 1973	Capacity for 60 young people; accommodates males under 16 years on remand or control orders	
Riverina Juvenile Justice Centre	Wagga Wagga, Riverina	October 1984	Capacity for 45 young people; accommodates low to medium risk males on remand or control orders	

== See also ==
- Department of Communities and Justice
- Government of New South Wales
- List of New South Wales government agencies
