= Danny Wicks =

Australian rugby league footballer (born 1985)

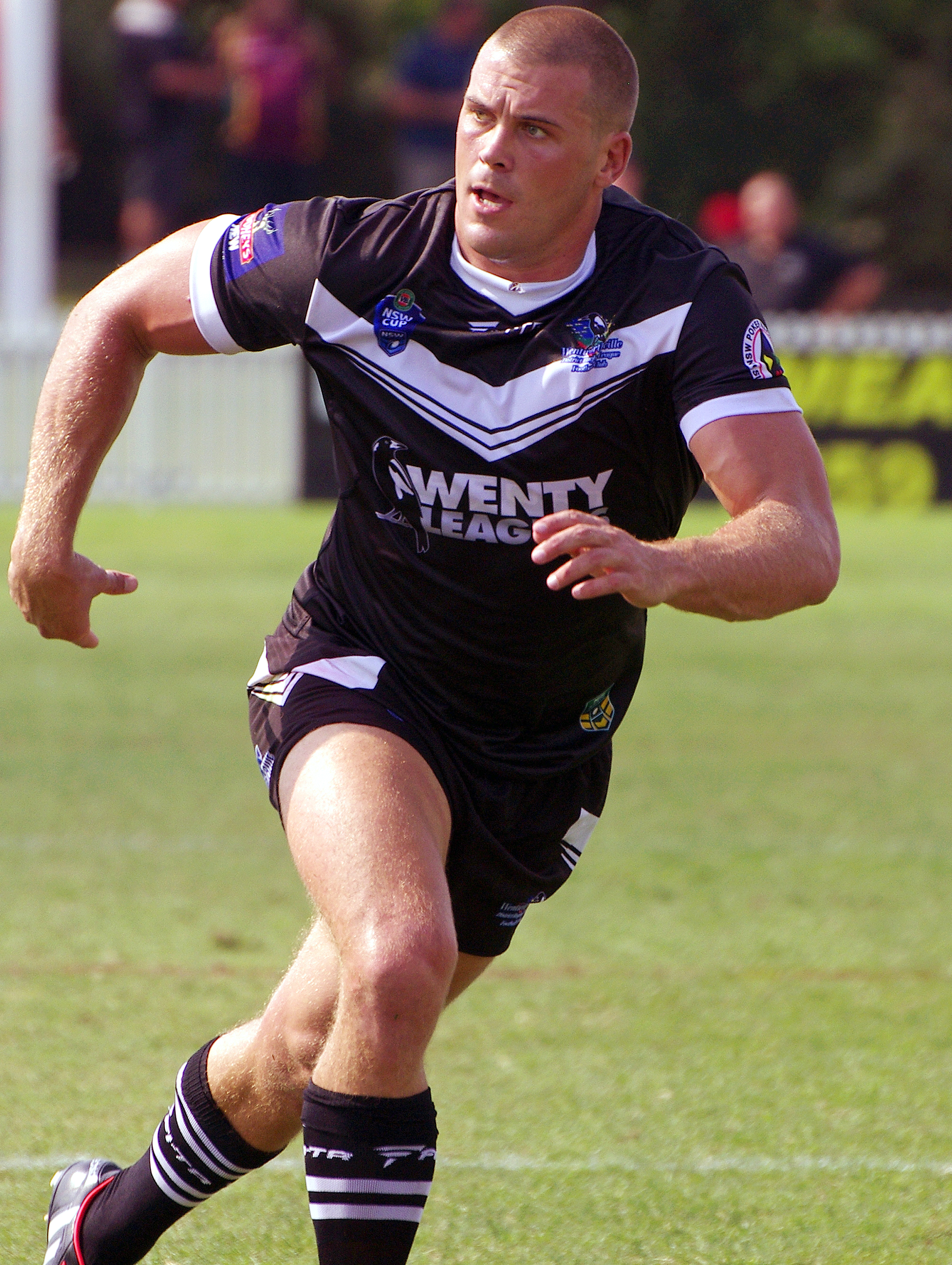

Personal information
- Born: 5 December 1985 (age 40) Grafton, New South Wales, Australia

Playing information
- Height: 189 cm (6 ft 2 in)
- Weight: 106 kg (16 st 10 lb)
- Position: Prop
Club
Years	Team	Pld	T	G	FG	P
2006–07	St. George Illawarra	29	2	0	0	8
2008–09	Newcastle Knights	40	4	0	0	16
2015–16	Parramatta Eels	35	3	0	0	12
	Total	104	9	0	0	36

Danny Wicks (born 5 December 1985) is an Australian former professional rugby league footballer who played as a prop in the NRL for the St. George Illawarra Dragons, Newcastle Knights and the Parramatta Eels.

From September 2011 to March 2013, Wicks served an eighteen-month prison sentence for trafficking drugs.

== Early life ==
Born in Grafton, New South Wales, Wicks played his junior football for the Grafton Ghosts, before being signed by the St. George Illawarra Dragons.

== Playing career ==
=== Early career ===
In 2006, Wicks played for the St. George Illawarra Dragons NSW Cup team.

=== 2006 ===
In round 10 of the 2006 NRL season, Wicks made his NRL debut for St. George Illawarra against the New Zealand Warriors. Wicks made 17 appearances in his debut season including the preliminary final defeat against Melbourne. He scored a try on debut.

=== 2007 ===
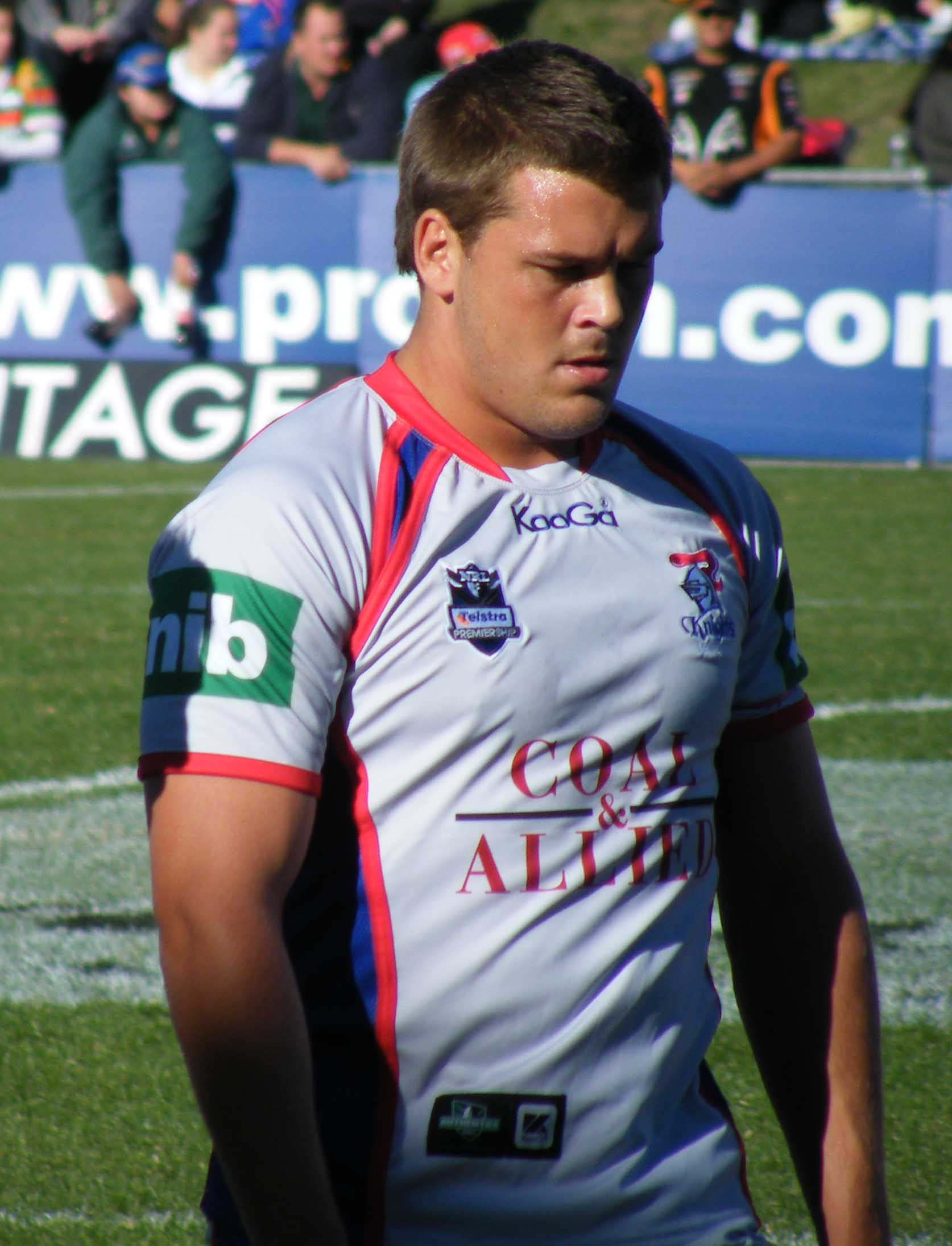
Wicks playing for the Newcastle Knights

In 2007, Wicks signed a three-year contract with the Newcastle Knights starting in 2008, following Brian Smith's clean out of the club. In a 2008 interview, Smith referred to Wicks as "Wicksy".

=== 2009 ===
In December 2009, Wicks was arrested for supplying prohibited drugs and possession of prohibited drugs. After being released on bail, he quit the Knights "so the club can move forward".

=== 2010 ===
In 2010, Wicks played for the Grafton Ghosts while his matter was in the courts, eventually being sentenced to eighteen months in prison.

=== 2014 ===
In May 2014, Wicks' agent started approaching clubs about the possibility of signing him to a contract for 2015, with his four-year WADA suspension for drugs ending in September 2014. During his stay in prison, Wicks lost 20 kilograms to get back to his old playing weight of 106 kilograms. On 30 October 2014, he signed a 1-year contract with the Parramatta Eels starting in 2015. He made his return to the NRL in round 2 of the 2015 NRL season against the Canterbury-Bankstown Bulldogs. On 11 April 2015, he re-signed with the Eels on a one-year contract.

=== 2016 ===
In November 2016, Wicks announced his immediate retirement from professional rugby league despite signing a two-year contract extension with the Parramatta Eels earlier that year.

=== 2017 ===
On 13 July 2017 it was revealed that Wicks had resumed playing on the NSW Mid North Coast with Group 2 side the Grafton Ghosts. He captain-coached the team to win both a premiership and the NSW Country Rugby League's Clayton Cup.

== Drug conviction ==
On 16 December 2009, Wicks was arrested and charged with eight drug related offences, including six counts of supplying a prohibited drug and two counts of possessing a prohibited drug. Police said that Strike Force Welham had been set up to investigate the supply of amphetamine, cocaine and ecstasy in the Clarence Valley region. Wicks was arrested as he drove his car along Brunker Road, Adamstown at around 6:30am, as part of coordinated police raids in four locations. In September 2011, he was sentenced to a maximum of three years in jail after being found guilty of trafficking drugs. He was released on 29 March 2013 after serving eighteen months of a three-year sentence at Glen Innes Correctional Centre.
