= Mid North Coast Correctional Centre =

Prison in New South Wales, Australia

- Interactive map of Mid North Coast Correctional Centre
- Location: West Kempsey, New South Wales, Australia; 31.0675°S 152.7527°E
- Status: Operational
- Security class: Minimum and maximum (males and females)
- Capacity: 1440
- Opened: 15 July 2004
- Managed by: Corrective Services NSW

The Mid North Coast Correctional Centre, an Australian minimum to maximum security prison for males and females, is located in Aldavilla, West Kempsey, New South Wales, Australia, 455 kilometres (283 mi) north of Sydney. The facility is operated by Corrective Services NSW, an agency of the Department of Communities and Justice, of the Government of New South Wales. The Centre accepts sentenced and unsentenced felons under New South Wales and/or Commonwealth legislation.

== History ==
Built on an old Aboriginal site that was a sacred area to the Dunghutti nation, the centre was opened by the Premier, Bob Carr, in July 2004.

== Notable inmates ==
- Rodney Adler – disgraced businessman.
- Austin Allan Hughes – co–convicted for the 1994 murder of John Ashfield, aged six years.
- Bronson Blessington – At the age of just 14 was sentenced to life imprisonment for his role in the 1988 murder of Janine Balding

== See also ==
- Punishment in Australia
