= Tamworth Correctional Centre =

Prison in New South Wales, Australia

- Interactive map of Tamworth Correctional Centre
- Location: Tamworth, New South Wales; 31°05′32″S 150°55′50″E
- Status: Operational
- Security class: Medium (males only)
- Population: 89, July 2011.
- Opened: 1991
- Former name: Tamworth Institution for Boys
- Managed by: Corrective Services NSW

Tamworth Correctional Centre, an Australian medium security prison for males, is located in Tamworth, New South Wales, 397 kilometres (247 mi) north of Sydney. The facility is operated by Corrective Services NSW, an agency of the Department of Communities and Justice, of the Government of New South Wales. The Centre detains sentenced and remand prisoners under New South Wales and/or Commonwealth legislation and serves as a reception prison for north–western New South Wales. A periodic detention centre for males was opened in March 1997.

== History ==
The first records of correctional facilities being established in Tamworth was on 17 December 1864 when the Police Magistrate at Tamworth was appointed as the Visiting Justice at the Tamworth Gaol. In 1868, a gaoler and sheriff were appointed.

At the start of 1920 there were 11 prisoners detained. During the year, 201 prisoners were received, with 183 discharged, leaving 29 in prison on 31 December 1920. Almost 20 per cent of the prisoners were aged under 21 years. The Tamworth Gaol closed on 25 March 1943.

Prior to its opening as an adult male correctional centre in 1991, the facility was variously known as the Tamworth Institution for Boys, and the Tamworth Boys’ Home. Endeavour House was a male juvenile justice centre, that pre–dated the establishment of the Kariong Youth Correctional Centre, which opened in September 1991.

== See also ==
- Punishment in Australia
