= Parklea Correctional Centre =

Australian maximum and minimum security prison

- Interactive map of Parklea Correctional Centre
- Location: Parklea, New South Wales; 33°43′24″S 150°55′7″E
- Status: Operational
- Security class: Maximum and minimum (males only)
- Capacity: Maximum – 1230; Minimum – 120
- Opened: 1983
- Managed by: MTC Ventia (Previously GEO Group until November 2018)

Parklea Correctional Centre, a privately managed Australian maximum and minimum security prison for males, is located at Parklea, in the north-western suburbs of Sydney, New South Wales. The facility is operated by Corrective Services NSW and has a current capacity for 1,350 inmates. The Centre accepts prisoners charged and convicted under New South Wales and/or Commonwealth legislation and incorporates a minimum-security work-release centre for inmates nearing release with a capacity of 120. A Compulsory Drug Treatment Correctional unit is incorporated within the centre. The facility was transferred back to the NSW government in October 2026.

== History ==
Following a recommendation of the Royal Commission into New South Wales Prisons (1976–1978), a prison was established at Parklea and initially designated as a maximum-security prison. The prison was scheduled to open in October 1983, but following a scandal involving Rex Jackson, the opening did not take place until September 1985, although the first inmates were received in November 1983. The Centre opened with about 220 maximum-security inmates with about the same number of prison officers.

=== 1st riot (1987) ===
On 13 December 1987, prisoners began a disturbance that was attributed to the consumption of "gaol brew" alcohol from fermenting fruit and sugar. During the riot, ten prison officers were injured, one officer was struck over the head with a typewriter, and several required transport to hospital. A subsequent review of procedures resulted in the withdrawal of oranges and sugar from all NSW correctional facilities.

=== 2nd riot (1990): down-grading to medium-security ===
A second riot occurred on 23 September 1990, following the introduction of a restrictive policy for prisoners private property by Minister for Corrective Services Michael Yabsley. The incident caused massive damage to the gaol and a number of other prison institutions across the state who rioted in protest against the policy. Lockdowns in the prison system occurred across the state, which led the Australian Human Rights Commission to describe the conditions in NSW as "a very serious violation of human rights". A large number of prisoners remained locked in their cells for one month following the riots.

After the riots, the prison was reclassified from maximum-security to medium-security, and in 1992 was designated as a correctional prison for young offenders, after a campaign to create such a facility led by Children's Magistrate Barbara Holborow. In 2001 Parklea was reclassified to maximum security, and inmate numbers were expanded as an additional 92 cells were completed.

=== Creation of Compulsory Drug Treatment Correctional Centre (CDTCC) (2006) ===
The Compulsory Drug Treatment Correctional Centre (CDTCC) was set up at Parklea adjacent to the Parklea Correctional Centre in 2006. The CDTCC is a stand-alone prison with a stable sentenced inmate population, where patients with repeat drug-related charges participate in comprehensive drug treatment and rehabilitation.

CDTCC can accommodate 70 inmates undergoing Stage 1 and 2 of the Compulsory Drug Treatment Program, with a further 30 inmates undertaking Stage 3 which comprises detention in the community. Entry to the program is by way of an order issued by the Drug Court.

=== Privatisation (2008) ===
In the 2008 'mini-budget', the New South Wales Government announced its plans to privatise two prisons, Parklea and Cessnock Correctional Centre. Protesting against the privatisation plans, prison officers commenced industrial action during May 2009. While the privatisation of Cessnock was eventually ruled out, on 30 September 2009 it was announced that GEO Group Australia had been awarded the contract to manage Parklea Correctional Centre, commencing on 1 November 2009.

In March 2025, it was announced that by October 2026, the facility would be returned to government ownership.

== Current operations ==
GEO Group Australia assumed responsibility for operations at 6:00 a.m. on 31 October 2009, the handover representing the first time an operational publicly managed prison in Australia had been transferred to private management. In response to parliamentary questions in November 2009, the NSW Minister for Corrections, John Robertson, described the transition as 'hugely successful'. The transition involved GEO Group Australia seconding staff from its other prisons in NSW, Victoria, and Queensland. To ensure robust oversight of the transition process and that GEO complied with its obligations, Corrective Services NSW installed a team of senior staff on-site for the period of transition.

The financial impact of the privatisation of Parklea Correctional Centre was immediate with media reporting on 9 November that the correctional staff overtime budget across the NSW publicly managed prisons had reduced by $70,000 a day.

In January 2011, Ron Woodham, the Commissioner for Corrective Services NSW, ordered that GEO Group Australia move all 73 inmates from Parklea Correctional Centre as part of a "major security upgrade" following the escape of three inmates from the minimum-security facility. Following the installation of new perimeter fencing and a review of the classification of all minimum-security inmates, the minimum-security facility was reopened.

In March 2025, it was announced that upon the expiration of MTC Australia's contract to run the facility in October 2026, the prison will come under public ownership.

At 8:00 p.m. on 30 September 2026, Parklea Correctional Centre was transferred back to the New South Wales Government, marking almost 17 years since the privatisation of the facility.

== Notable prisoners ==
The following individuals have served all or part of their sentence at the Parklea Correctional Centre:

Inmate name	Date sentenced	Length of sentence	Currently incarcerated	Date eligible for release	Nature of conviction / Notoriety	Notes
Jarryd Hayne	22 March 2021	5 years 9 months (3 years 8 months non-parole period)	No	5 January 2025	Sexual assault/ Former NRL player	Served part of sentence at Parklea Correctional Centre before being transferred to Cooma Correctional Centre

== See also ==
- Punishment in Australia
