= Emu Plains Correctional Centre =

Prison in New South Wales, Australia

- Interactive map of Emu Plains Correctional Centre
- Location: Emu Plains, New South Wales; 33.7379°S 150.6679°E
- Status: Temporarily closed
- Security class: Minimum (female)
- Opened: December 1914 (as Emu Plains Prison Farm)
- Managed by: Corrective Services NSW

Emu Plains Correctional Centre is an Australian minimum security prison, previously known as Penrith minimum security prison. It is located on Old Bathurst Rd, Emu Plains, New South Wales. The centre is operated by Corrective Services NSW an agency of the Department of Communities and Justice of the Government of New South Wales. The centre detained sentenced and remand prisoners under New South Wales and/or Commonwealth legislation. It is temporarily closed.

== Facilities ==
Established as a working dairy farm in 1914, the Emu Plains Prison Farm accommodated male inmates as part of a process of rehabilitation through farming. The centre was remodelled in 1957 as Emu Plains Training Centre and again in 1976 as Emu Plains Detention Centre. In 1994, the centre was again remodelled and all male inmates were transferred to other correctional facilities, with the Emu Plain Correctional Centre created as a minimum security prison for women.

In 1996 a women's and children's program was established that permitted inmates to maintain closer contact with their children. The program allows some children to stay with their mother in custody and also allows inmates to make recordings of book readings for their children.

Inmates were employed in the dairy for dairy processing, and previously assisted in the breeding and training of assistance dogs to help people with disabilities. Emu Plains also ran a work release program.

== Notable prisoners ==
- Anu Singh – convicted for the 1997 murder of her boyfriend.

== See also ==
- Punishment in Australia
