= Lithgow Correctional Centre =

Prison near Lithgow, Australia

- Interactive map of Lithgow Correctional Centre
- Location: Marrangaroo, New South Wales; 33°25′47″S 150°6′59″E
- Status: Operational
- Security class: Maximum (male)
- Opened: 1990; 36 years ago
- Managed by: Corrective Services NSW

Lithgow Correctional Centre is a prison near Lithgow, Australia, operated by Corrective Services NSW, an agency of the New South Wales state government. The prison houses sentenced male inmates with a maximum security classification.

== History ==
Data obtained from Corrective Services NSW by The Sydney Morning Herald revealed that between July 2006 and May 2009, 67 assaults occurred at the centre, one of which was considered serious.

Following the 2008 discovery of a prison drug ring orchestrated from inside Lithgow Correctional Centre by Bassam Hamzy through use of a mobile phone, prison officials sought approval for the introduction of a trial of mobile phone jamming technology. The trial began on 24 September 2013, and has been extended to 1 November 2018.

In 2011, prison officials announced a trial ban of smoking in the centre, impacting both inmates and officers. Nicotine patches were issued to inmates as a substitute. Prisoners were permitted to smoke in some designated outdoor areas, but were not permitted to smoke in their cells or inside jail facilities. The trial was due to commence in early 2012, for a period of six months.

== Notable prisoners ==
- John Wayne Glover – (1932–2005) English Australian serial killer, convicted of the murders of 8 elderly women on Sydney's North Shore in 1989 and 1990
- Andrew Kalajzich – a former millionaire hotel owner, jailed for 25 years for the 1986 murder of his wife
- Milton Orkopoulos – a disgraced former Australian Labor Party politician from New South Wales, jailed in 2008 for 13 years and eight months for child sex and drugs offences
- Keith Schreiber – convicted of the stabbing murder of Jack van Krevel in his home at Albion Park
- Neddy Smith
- Gary and Michael Murphy – two of five men (including 3 brothers) sentenced to life imprisonment for the gang rape and murder at Prospect, New South Wales of Sydney nurse Anita Cobby
- Rodney Francis Cameron – (1953–2025) sentenced to life imprisonment, never to be released, for the murder of four victims (and allegedly eight victims)
- Sef Gonzalez – sentenced to 3 consecutive life sentences without parole for the triple homicide (murder) in Sydney, NSW. He has been made previous attempts of appeal three separate times, with the most recent being in August 2025, on mental grounds.

== Visitor access ==
Public transport to the centre is available from Lithgow railway station. Lithgow Buslines run buses along the Great Western Highway from Lithgow to Bathurst, some of which stop near Lithgow Correctional Centre. Other special bus services run directly to the centre.

Parking is available for visitors, and signs direct vehicles to the centre from the Great Western Highway. Visitors require bookings to see inmates, which can only be made on weekdays. Strict restrictions and security checks apply to all visitors.

== See also ==
- Punishment in Australia
