= Department of Justice (New South Wales) =

New South Wales Department of Justice

Department overview
- Formed: 1 July 2009
- Preceding agencies: Department of Police and Justice; Attorney General's Department; Department of Juvenile Justice; Department of Corrective Services
- Dissolved: 1 July 2019
- Superseding Department: Department of Communities and Justice
- Type: Department
- Jurisdiction: New South Wales
- Headquarters: 160 Marsden Street, Parramatta, New South Wales, Australia
- Employees: 4,300 (2008)
- Ministers responsible: Hon. Mark Speakman SC, MP, Attorney General; Hon. Troy Grant MP, Minister for Police Minister for Emergency Services; Hon. David Elliott MP, Minister for Counter Terrorism Minister for Corrections
- Department executive: Michael Coutts-Trotter, Secretary
- Child agencies: Judicial Commission; Liquor & Gaming New South Wales; Rural Fire Service; State Emergency Service; NSW Crime Commission; Office of the Director of Public Prosecutions
- Website: Department of Justice

The Department of Justice was a state government agency in New South Wales, Australia, that operated under various names between 2009 and 2019. In 2019, most of its functions were absorbed by a new Department of Communities and Justice. The department was responsible for the state's justice system – courts, prosecutions, prisons, sheriffs – and most emergency service agencies.

The department was known as the Department of Justice and Attorney General (2009–2011), the Department of Attorney General and Justice (2011–2014), the Department of Police and Justice (2014) and finally the Department of Justice (2014–2019).

== History ==
The re-organisation of the legal system of Colonial New South Wales led to the creation of the Attorney-General, an appointed law officer. Following the creation of self-government in 1856, the position of Attorney-General became an officer appointed by the Government of the day from within the membership of the Parliament of New South Wales.

In 1901, the Department of Attorney General and the Department of Justice were amalgamated into the Department of the Attorney General and Justice. In 1911, two separate branches of the department were established, later called divisions which continued until the 1970s. Responsibility for police and corrective services were removed from the department in the 1970s; and by 1991 the Department of Courts Administration was split out of the department. Some four years later, the two departments were merged to reform the Attorney General's Department. The Justice portfolio was re-established in 2009 through the creation of a new Department of Justice and Attorney General, abolishing the old Attorney General's Department.

The headquarters of the department was at the Goodsell Building in Chifley Square. In 2008 the department's main business centres were relocated to newer offices in Parramatta.

Following the 2011 state election the department was merged with Corrective Services and renamed to its current name. On 23 April 2014 it was decided that the department would be renamed the Department of Police and Justice. Subsequent government initiatives lead to the department becoming the Department of Justice. Following the 2019 state election the department merged with the Department of Family and Community Services and most of the functions of both departments were transferred to the newly formed Department of Communities and Justice.

== Agencies administered ==
The following agencies were administered by the department until its abolition:

- Crown Solicitor's Office
- Fire and Rescue NSW
- Guardianship Tribunal of New South Wales
- Information and Privacy Commission
- Inspector of Custodial Services
- Juvenile Justice NSW
- Legal Aid NSW
- Liquor & Gaming New South Wales
- NSW Crime Commission
- NSW Registry of Births Deaths & Marriages
- NSW Rural Fire Service
- NSW Trustee and Guardian
- Office of the Director of Public Prosecutions
- Office of the New South Wales Sheriff
- State Emergency Service
