= Ryan Park =

Ryan Park may refer to:

== People ==
- Ryan Y. Park, Korean American lawyer and Solicitor General of North Carolina
- Ryan Park (politician), an Australian politician

== Places ==
- Ryan Park, Wyoming, an unincorporated place in Carbon County, Wyoming, USA
- Leo J. Ryan Memorial Park, a recreational city park located in Foster City, California, USA
- Ryan Provincial Park, a provincial park in British Columbia, Canada
- Archbishop Ryan Park, a park in Merrion Square, Dublin, Ireland
