= Office of the Sheriff of New South Wales =

New South Wales Sheriff's Office
Agency overview
- Formed: January 1824
- Preceding Agency: Provost Marshal of New South Wales
- Type: Department
- Jurisdiction: New South Wales
- Headquarters: John Maddison Tower, 86 Goulburn Street, Sydney, Sydney
- Employees: approx. 750 (2019)
- Minister responsible: The Hon. Michael Daley MP, Attorney General of New South Wales
- Agency executives: Tracey Hall PSM, The Sheriff of New South Wales; Michael Coutts-Trotter, Secretary of the NSW Department of Communities and Justice
- Parent Agency: Department of Communities and Justice
- Website: https://sheriff.nsw.gov.au/

The New South Wales Sheriff's Office is an agency of the Government of New South Wales, Australia, forming part of the Department of Communities and Justice and headed by the State's Sheriff. The current Sheriff is Tracey Hall PSM.

Sheriff's Officers are defined as Law Enforcement Officers under the Crimes Act 1900. They support the work of the State's court system, providing security at court complexes; enforcing writs, warrants and property seizure orders; and managing the jury system. The Office was established in 1824; prior to this, its functions were exercised by the fledgling colony's provost marshal. The NSW Sheriff's Office managed NSW prisons until 1874. It is Australia’s oldest law enforcement agency, with origins dating to 1824.

The Sheriff and their four deputies oversee court security, fines enforcement, and jury management. The office employs approximately 400 Sheriff’s Officers, Court Officers, and clerical staff across 58 offices throughout New South Wales. Sheriff’s Officers attend about 170 court and tribunal locations statewide.

== Role and Responsibilities ==
The primary role of the Sheriff’s Office is to protect the justice system of New South Wales and ensure that everyone who comes to court can safely access their rights. Uniformed Sheriff’s Officers maintain the security of court complexes many equipped with airport-style perimeter security and scanning systems and ensure the safety of judicial officers, legal professionals, and the public in all NSW courts and tribunals.

Incidents occur almost daily, with Sheriff's Officers routinely confiscating prohibited items, including weapons, and drugs.

=== Sheriff’s Officers ===
Sheriff’s Officers are the primary role within the Sheriff’s Office, they are sworn law enforcement officers with responsibilities in security, civil enforcement, and court support. Key duties include:

- Serving documents
- Enforcing writs, warrants, and court orders
- Maintaining court complex security and attendee safety
- Ensuring the welfare of jurors and protected witnesses
- Supporting day-to-day courtroom operations
- Undertaking law enforcement duties in compliance with legislation
- Accurate data entry and high-quality client service

They are required to operate without fear or favor in the interest of justice.

=== Court Security and Operations ===
Sheriff’s Officers provide perimeter and courtroom security, handle day-to-day courtroom support, and manage risks in environments where anxiety levels are often heightened among victims, offenders, support persons, and others. Training strongly emphasises de-escalation and communication skills.

=== Civil Enforcement ===
The NSW Sheriff’s Office plays a vital role in civil law enforcement. Responsibilities include serving and enforcing legal documents and orders from NSW courts and tribunals (warrants, summonses, and enforcement orders), as well as acting on behalf of Commonwealth courts such as the High Court of Australia, Federal Court of Australia, and Family Court of Australia.

Authorised actions include:

- Executing writs, warrants, and Property Seizure Orders
- Seizing and selling personal assets and property
- Apprehending individuals
- Arresting ships and cargo

Seized goods may be sold at public Sheriff’s auctions, with proceeds applied to satisfy outstanding court orders. Sheriff’s Officers also enforce fines.

=== Jury Administration ===
The office administers the jury system for New South Wales, preparing jury rolls for 73 districts. It summons up to 750,000 jurors annually and supports an average of 800–900 jury trials per year (for example, approximately 740 cases in the District Courts in 2022 despite pandemic restrictions).

Duties include jury roll management, summoning jurors, processing exemptions, and ensuring payment for serving jurors. Court Officers assist with welcoming jurors, roll call, empanelment, welfare support during trials, communicating with judges, handling exhibits, swearing in witnesses, operating courtroom equipment, and maintaining confidentiality.

=== Court Officers ===
Court Officers support the administration of justice through varied duties, including:

- Welcoming jurors and handling public enquiries
- Assisting with jury roll call and empanelment
- Acting as the primary point of contact for jurors during trials
- Calling and swearing in witnesses; handling exhibits
- Communicating juror questions to the judge
- Advising when a jury is ready to deliver a verdict
- Operating audiovisual and other courtroom equipment (videos, DVDs, hearing loops, cameras, laptops, evidence recording systems)
- Preparing courtrooms
- Ensuring confidentiality, privacy, and security
- Providing welfare and comfort support to jurors

== Training and Recruitment ==
Recruits must complete a 12-week intensive induction program at the Sheriff and Justice Academy in Parramatta. This includes classroom instruction on approximately 60 relevant legal Acts, physical/tactical training, on-the-job learning, and a strong focus on de-escalation and communication. Recruits must obtain a Certificate III in Government within 12 months on the job and serve a 12-month probationary period.

During induction, recruits may rotate through different learning centres. Post-probation, staff may be deployed anywhere in metropolitan or regional NSW based on operational needs.

The Sheriff’s Office maintains a rank structure supporting management and technical roles. Advancement is merit-based, with opportunities across various commands and specialisations.

== Sheriffs of New South Wales ==
Sheriffs of New South Wales
Date	Sheriff
1824–1827	John Mackanass
1828	William Carter
1829–1841	Thomas Macquoid
1842	William Hustler
1843–1849	Adolphus William Young
1849–1854	Gilbert Eliot
1855–1860	John O'Neill Brenan
1861–1864	George Richard Uhr
1864–1874	Harold Maclean
1874–1896	Charles Cowper
1896–1917	Cecil Edmunds Bridgewater Maybury
1917–1920	Charles Richard Walsh
1920–1925	Walter William Crockford
1925–1939	George Francis Murphy
1939–1945	Harry Charles Lester
1945–1960	Roland Oliver Elliot
1960–1968	Donald Mercer Richardson
1968–1974	Thomas Alexander Woodward
1974–1985	George Francis Hanson
1985–1997	David Michael Lennon
1997–1998	Nerida Johnston (Acting)
1998–2002	Bruce Kelly
2002–2003	Kenneth Holdgate (Acting)
2003–2007	Gary Byles
2007–2008	Reg Kruit (Acting)
2008–2011	Christopher Benjamin Allen
2012–	Tracey Hall

== See also ==
- Coroner's Court of New South Wales
- Corrective Services NSW
- Supreme Court of New South Wales
