= Broken Hill Correctional Centre =

Prison in New South Wales, Australia

- Interactive map of Broken Hill Correctional Centre
- Location: Broken Hill, New South Wales; 31°57′54.55″S 141°27′23.35″E
- Status: Operational
- Security class: Minimum to medium (male and female); Periodic detention centre
- Managed by: Corrective Services NSW

Broken Hill Correctional Centre, formerly Broken Hill Gaol, is an Australian minimum and medium security prison for men and women located in Broken Hill, New South Wales, around 1,190 km (740 mi) from Sydney. Opened in 1892, it is the fourth-oldest prison still in operation in NSW.

== History ==
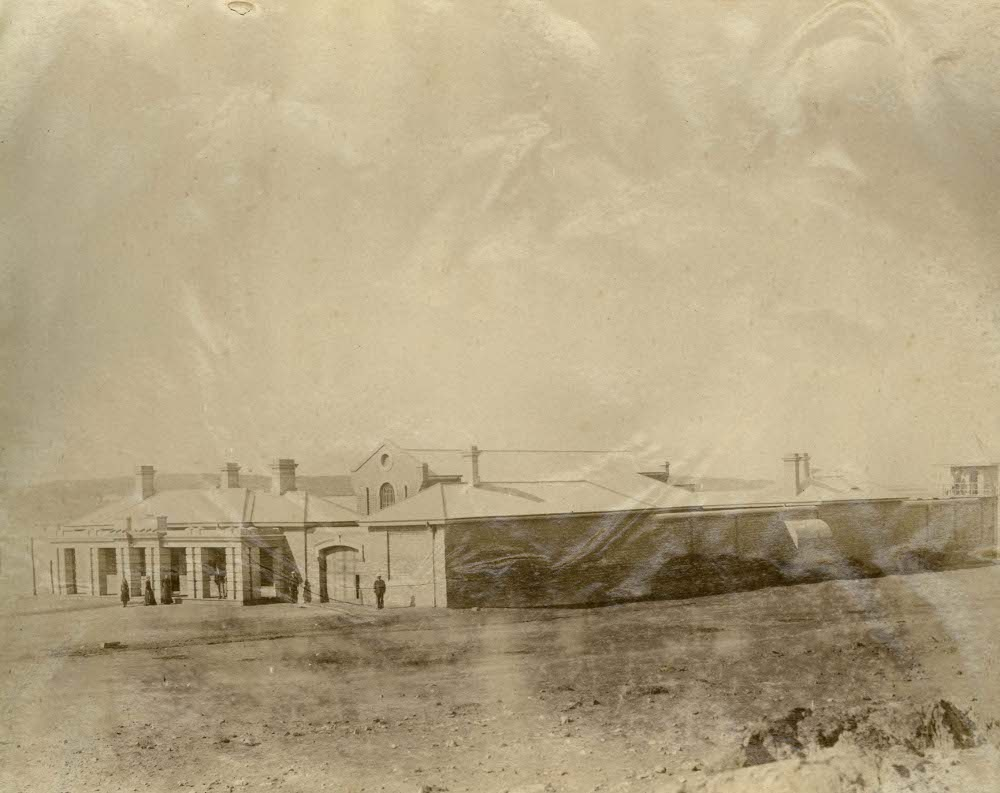
Broken Hill Gaol in 1892

The original jail was built in 1892, designed by the Colonial Architect, James Barnet, who also designed the Sydney Museum, among others. Its construction cost £15,000, and was carried out by Dobbee and Son. Broken Hill Gaol, as it was named, opened on 8 November 1892 as a 90-bed facility with five prison wardens and initially holding two female and 19 male prisoners.

On 11 June 1907, Peter Sadeek was hanged for the murder of a woman, and is the only prisoner executed at the prison.

During World War II, from 1942 to 1944 the prison, after being vacated, was taken over by the Commonwealth Government, to use as a safe place to store the nation's reserves of gold, holding around £AU44.8 million of gold, owned by the Bank of England, Commonwealth Bank and the Bank of Java.

It remains the fourth-oldest operating prison in NSW.

== Governance and description ==
The centre is operated by Corrective Services NSW, an agency of the Department of Communities and Justice of the Government of New South Wales. The centre detains sentenced and unsentenced inmates under New South Wales and/or Commonwealth legislation. The medium security section is a reception prison for a large area of the state, bordered by Queensland in the north, Victoria in the south, and South Australia in the west.

As of 2017, the prison employs more than 60 staff, some of whom work from a city office with prisoners on parole, and 90 prisoners. It is important to the Far West region, as it allows for imprisonment closer to families who live in the area.

== Programs ==
Many of the prisoners are employed by Corrective Services Industries, in work such as catering, maintenance and community work, and they are also offered various vocational and education opportunities as a means of helping them to gain employment after their release.

Since 2021, yarning circles have been introduced for Aboriginal and Torres Strait Islander people in men's and women's prisons across NSW, starting with Broken Hill – in the men's prison in 2021, and the women's prison in 2022. The aim of the circles is to encourage communication, connect Indigenous inmates with their culture, and reduce reoffending and the high rates of incarceration of Aboriginal and Torres Strait Islander people.

== Notable inmates ==
- Michael Ibrahim – brother of John Ibrahim
