= Cessnock Correctional Centre =

Men's prison in Cessnock, New South Wales, Australia

Cessnock Correctional Complex
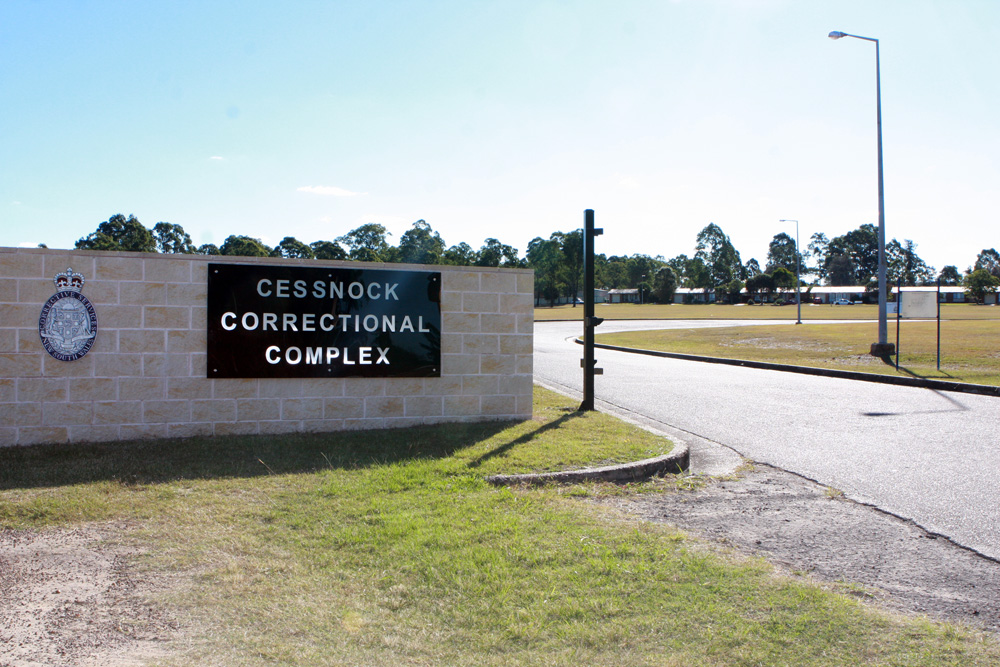
- Interactive map of Cessnock Correctional Complex
- Location: Cessnock, New South Wales; 32°49′01″S 151°20′21″E
- Status: Operational
- Security class: Minimum (with a maximum security area for sex offenders)
- Capacity: 750
- Opened: 1972
- Managed by: Corrective Services NSW

Cessnock Correctional Centre, an Australian minimum and maximum security prison for males, is located in Cessnock, New South Wales. It was opened in 1972 under the name Cessnock Training Centre. The centre is operated by Corrective Services NSW. It detains sentenced and remand prisoners under New South Wales and/or Commonwealth legislation.

Facilities were significantly updated during 2012, including the completion of Australia's first purpose-built maximum security sex offenders unit; built at a cost of $97 million.

== Notable prisoners ==
- Nathan Baggaley – a former Olympic canoe sprinter, jailed between 2009 and 2011 for dealing ecstasy.
- William MacDonald – English-born Australian serial killer (born Allen Ginsberg, 1924–2015)
- Lenny McPherson (1921–1996) – organised crime figure.
- Harry M Miller – (1934–2018) New Zealand-Australian media agent, promoter and publicist, convicted of fraud.
- Nigel Milsom – Archibald Prize-winning painter, armed robbery.
- Gareth Ward – a former politician who was a councillor for the City of Shoalhaven council and a former MP for the Kiama electoral district on the South Coast, convicted sex offender currently awaiting sentencing.
- Ray Williams – disgraced businessman.
