= Garnham Blaxcell =

Merchant and trader in the colony of New South Wales, Australia

Garnham Blaxcell (1778-3 October 1817) was a merchant and trader in the colony of New South Wales, Australia.
