= Harold Maclean =

Australian civil servant

Harold Maclean (14 May 1828 – 6 November 1889) was an Australian civil servant.

== Early life ==
Harold Maclean was born on 14 May 1828; his father was a captain.

== Career ==
Described as a "modest, humane and hard-working individual", Maclean was selected to serve as Inspector of Prisons for New South Wales. As sheriff of New South Wales, Maclean is credited with abolishing the treadmill punishment once meted out at jails in the region. Despite being heavily lauded for his capabilities, Maclean worked on a low salary.

Maclean supervised the design and construction of Trial Bay Gaol. He advocated a number of principles of prison reform including the provision of substantial masonry accommodation rather than cheaply constructed barracks, the isolation of prisoners from each other (and hence bad influence and ideas) by the provision of a cell per prisoner. He was also a believer in the modern British penal model where long term prisoners reaching the last years of their sentence, were employed in the construction of public works projects. Here they could learn skills useful for future employment and enjoy new privileges and freedoms as they approached the time of their release from prison.

== Death ==
Maclean died in 1889 at his Potts Point house. The cause of his death was typhoid. His funeral was held at Waverley Cemetery on 9 November 1889 and he was buried there. After his death, his office as Controller General of Prisons was closed.
