= Junee Correctional Centre =

Prison in Junee, Australia

- Interactive map of Junee Correctional Centre
- Location: Junee, New South Wales; 34°51′39″S 147°33′23″E
- Status: Operational
- Security class: Minimum to Maximum
- Capacity: Minimum – 140; Medium – 650; Maximum — 480
- Opened: 19 March 1993
- Managed by: GEO Group Australia
- Website: www.nsw.gov.au

Junee Correctional Centre is a prison in Junee, Australia, operated by Corrective Services NSW. The prison houses sentenced male inmates with a maximum, medium or minimum security classification, along with a small number of female remand inmates in transit to other locations. The centre has a total capacity of 1279.

The prison is made up of three sections: a medium-security facility for male inmates, a minimum-security facility for male inmates, and a new maximum-security facility for male inmates.

Junee opened in 1993 as the first privately operated prison in NSW. It will be brought into public ownership in April 2025.

== History ==
During 1989, representatives of the New South Wales Department of Corrections, including the Minister for Corrective Services, Michael Yabsley, visited the United States to learn first-hand about private corrections management. They toured US state and federal managed corrections facilities as well as privately managed correction facilities. Once satisfied that substantial benefits could be gained from private contract management, Coalition support was gained and laws were amended. Instructions went out to government agencies to develop a competitive process to bring private corrections management to New South Wales. It was also decided that to allow for maximum efficiencies in management, the government would also call for tenders for private design and construction of a new prison.

Following a call to local government authorities for an expression of interest in a privately managed correctional facility being located within local government boundaries, Junee town leaders and the elected representatives strongly supported the concept, and the town was selected as the site for a new correctional centre. The ensuing years saw extensive community consultation by both Corrective Services NSW and NSW Public Works as the government went about selecting an appropriate building contractor and final operator. By 1991, the NSW Government executed a contract with Australasian Correctional Services (ACS) for design and construction, and another contract with the same company for the management of the centre. ACS in turn executed two contracts, one with Thiess Contractors for the design and construction of the facility and one with Australasian Correctional Management for the management of the centre.

The centre, completed in 1993 at a cost of $53 million, was expected upon opening to have a 30 per cent cost saving compared to traditional government prison operations. A special focus of this facility was the establishment of a private industry program to provide employment, valuable skills training and wages to inmates. Two other correctional centres built by the NSW Government at that time, but with each half capacity, were budgeted to cost $57 million each.

New South Wales was the second state in Australia, after Queensland, to introduce private prisons. Junee was the first prison in Australia to be designed, constructed and managed by the private sector under a single contractual arrangement. The prison is managed by the GEO Group Australia, which was granted a new contract in 2001.

Following an announcement in November 2023, the prison will be brought into public ownership on 1 April 2025. The prison will be operated by Corrective Services NSW.

== See also ==
- Punishment in Australia
