= Bathurst Correctional Centre =

Building in New South Wales, Australia

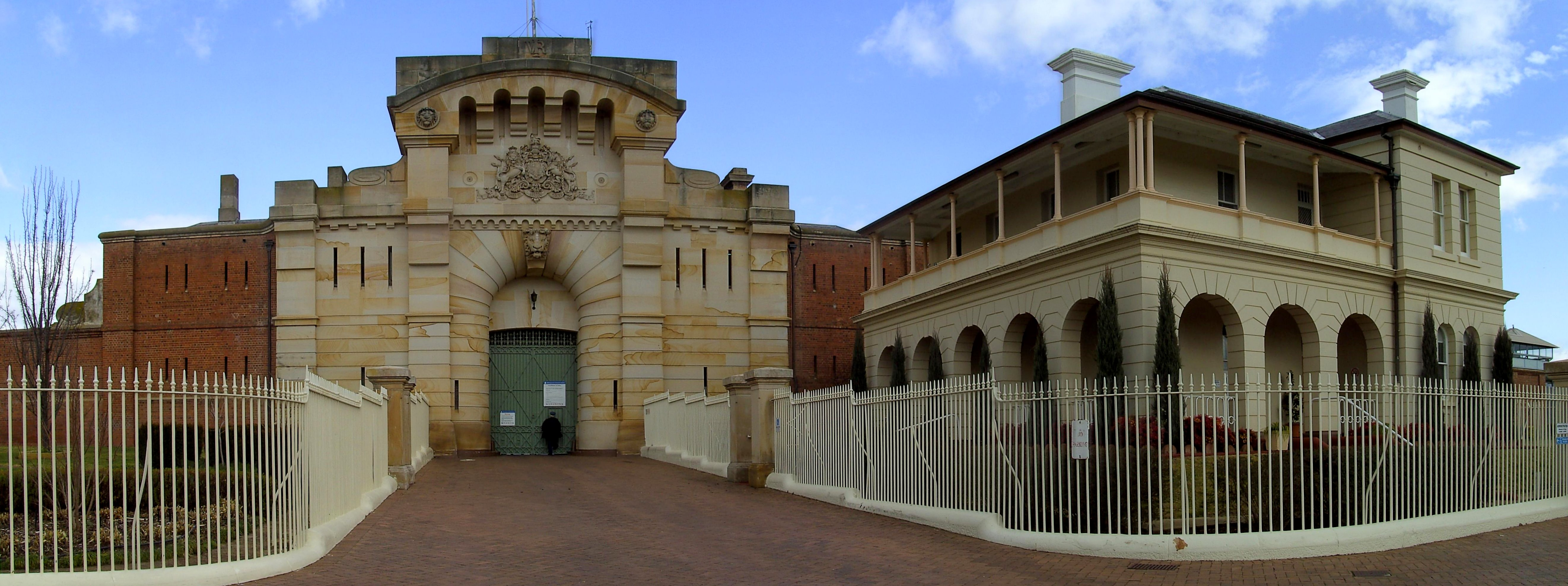
- The hand-carved sandstone gate and façade of the Bathurst Correctional Complex

- Location in New South Wales
- Location: Bathurst, New South Wales, Australia; 33°25′04″S 149°33′30″E
- Status: Operational
- Security class: Maximum / Medium / Minimum
- Capacity: 222
- Opened: 7 June 1888
- Former name: Bathurst Gaol
- Managed by: Department of Communities and Justice
- Website: Bathurst Correctional Centre
- Building details

General information
- Cost: A£102,000

Technical details
- Material: Sandstone and brick

Design and construction
- Architects: James Barnet; Walter Liberty Vernon
- Architecture firm: Colonial Architect of New South Wales

New South Wales Heritage Register
- Official name: Bathurst Correctional Centre
- Designated: 2 April 1999
- Reference no.: 00806

Bathurst Correctional Centre, originally built as Bathurst Gaol in 1888, is a prison for men and women located in the city of Bathurst, New South Wales, Australia, and operated by the Department of Communities and Justice. Bathurst holds inmates sentenced under State or Australian criminal law, along with a small number of remand prisoners.

The prison is made up of three sections: a medium-security and remand facility for male inmates, a minimum-security facility for male inmates, and a new maximum-security facility for male inmates, opened in 2020. A small number of female inmates are housed within a separate compound on the grounds of the medium-security area.

== History ==
Correction facilities were first established in the Bathurst town centre in circa 1830, as the Bathurst Gaol, adjacent to the Bathurst Court House, also designed by Barnet. As sanitary conditions at the town watch house deteriorated, a new jail was built to Barnet's designs. The old jail was demolished in 1889.

The jail was proclaimed on 7 June 1888, and built at a cost of just over 102,000 pounds. The hand-carved sandstone gate at the new jail featured an ornate sculptured lion's head holding a key that is a Victorian symbol designed to impress wrongdoers with the immense power and dignity of the law. Legend has it that when the key falls from the lion's mouth, the prisoner are allowed to go free. The new building which contained 308 cells and "commodious workshops" was complete and partly occupied in 1888. This was one of a number of jails rebuilt or enlarged in this period, the purpose of which was to commence the program of 'restricted association' of prison inmates. The Governor of the Bathurst jail reported on restricted association as follows:

"The restricted treatment for male prisoners has been in vogue for the past seventeen months, and has worked in every way satisfactorily. The prisoners are more obedient, and there is a marked improvement in the discipline; several of them have on many occasions told me that they would not desire to return to the old system. On the 11th December, the new treatment was introduced into the female division, under the supervision of the Comptroller-General for Prisons everything passed off satisfactorily, and ever since has worked well. A few days afterward the whole of the prisoners, by yards (when mustered for dinner) desired me to thank the Comptroller-General for his kindness in placing them under the treatment, stating that they were grateful for the concessions allowed to them in the way of reading and light at night."

Marble cutting and polishing provided works for the prisoners between 1893 and 1925. The jail accommodated the tougher and more experienced prisoners until 1914 when the jail then catered for the "previously convicted but hopeful cases". During WW1, rural industries such as dairy, pig-raising, market gardening, hay and fodder production were established. During WW2, the jail was used as an internment camp for some 200 German and other "enemy aliens". In 1957–62, a new cell block was built outside the jail's wall with accommodation for 94 prisoners. In 1974, riots at the jail caused much damage to the main buildings.

The jail generally accommodated prisoners where they "were deemed amenable to reformative influences" up until 1970 where the jail was reclassified as a maximum security prison.

=== Executions ===
The jail was the site for several executions by the gallows, with a drop to 14 feet (4.3 m) compared to the customary English 3–4 feet (0.91–1.22 m). The hangings at the old or new jails included:

- Monday 3 December 1866, an individual known as Spider, following a conviction for rape, and sentenced to death.
- 27 May 1868, a double execution occurred for separate prisoners who were escorted to the gallows before the executioner Bull. Albert Barnes was convicted of the murder of an old man who at one time was a fellow inmate of the Liverpool Benevolent Asylum. John McEvitt stated he was innocent of the murder of a boy, Francis Evans.
- Tuesday morning, 11 June 1872, John Conn (aged 59), following the murder of an elderly woman in March, although he maintained she had fallen from a cart and the injury and resulting death was caused by the turning wheel. Evidence suggested a violent blow by a tomahawk. He was led precisely at 9:00 am from his cells to the gallows, assisted by two hangmen: Bull and his assistant.
- Wednesday morning, 29 November 1893, Herbert Edward 'Bertie' Glasson, following a double–almost quadruple—murder at 2:30 am on 24 September 1893 at Carcoar of the City Bank manager, and a 24-year-old visitor, injuring the manager's wife and baby. Glasson was the first hanging in the new 1888 jail.

By December 1894, executioner Bull had been replaced by Howard and his assistant Goldrick, who undertook the second hanging in the new jail. The last executions were of Sydney Twelve members Frank Franz and Roland Nicholas Kennedy on Wednesday 20 December 1916 for the murder of a police constable. The death penalty for all offences in New South Wales was removed in 1985.

=== Riots ===
The Bathurst riots and Bathurst batterings were a series of violent disturbances and reprisals that occurred at the jail in October 1970 and February 1974. The second outbreak of violence led to the partial destruction and temporary closure of the prison, and ultimately to a Royal Commission into the State's prison system.

The 1980 film Stir is based on the 1974 riots at the prison.

=== Name change ===
Between 1992 and 1993, the name of Bathurst Gaol was changed to Bathurst Correctional Centre.

== Description ==
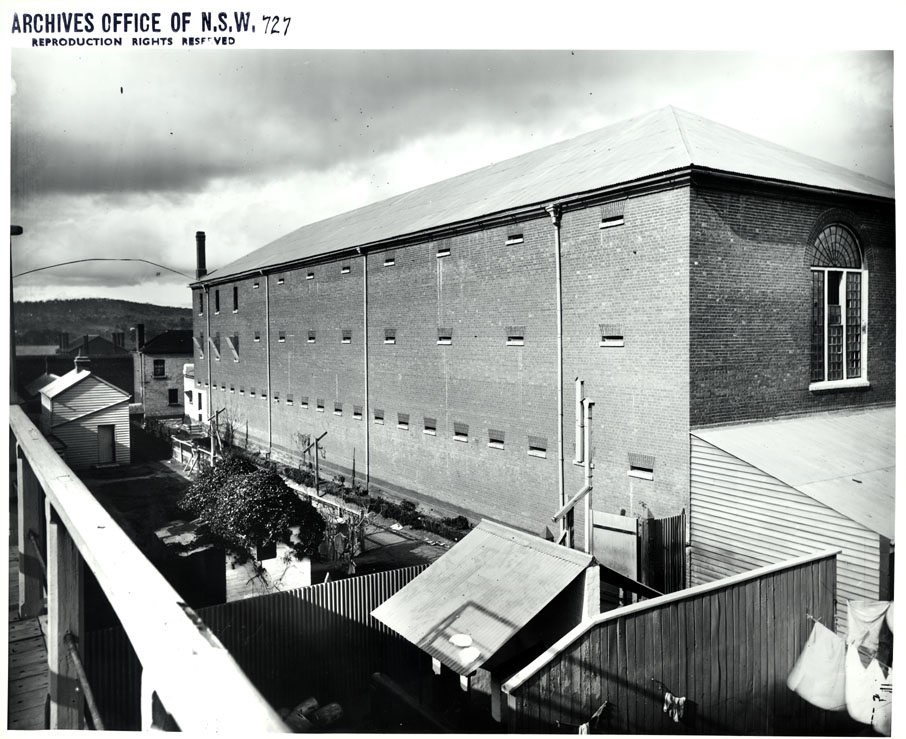
Old Bathurst Gaol, demolished c. 1880

Bathurst Gaol is composed of a square compound with a gatehouse and two watch towers located at the far corners. The Governor and Deputy Governors Residences are located outside the main compound walls. Internally the (now demolished) chapel formed the focus of the jail. Four cell ranges and the cookhouse radiated out from the chapel. On one side of the chapel forecourt was the totally separated female compound. On the other side was the male hospital.

Bathurst and Goulburn jails were almost identical in plan. Goulburn however remains more intact.

== Heritage listing ==
Bathurst Gaol is significant as one of two model prisons designed by the Colonial Architect's Office in the late 1870s and early 1880s; as an indication of advances in penal architecture in the late nineteenth century; for its continued use as a jail.

Bathurst Correctional Complex was listed on the New South Wales State Heritage Register on 2 April 1999.

== Industries ==
Inmates at the Centre may be employed in Corrective Service Industries (CSI) food services, the commercial laundry, technology/packaging and packaging business units. Inmates can also do general ground, horticulture, cleaning and building maintenance work on and outside the complex.

CSI also operates the Girrawaa Creative Centre, which was established in 1998. It employs around 15 Indigenous inmates at a time. The program is aimed at developing inmates' artistic skills while creating Aboriginal artefacts for sale. Pieces such as boomerangs, paintings, coasters, clapsticks and didgeridoos are produced for sale to the public directly from the gallery, online, to government agencies, and to wholesalers.

== Notable prisoners ==
- Rodney Adler – disgraced Australian businessman and former company director
- Jim McNeil (James Thomas McNeil) – violent criminal who became better known as the 'prison playwright'
- Bob Merritt, Aboriginal writer, who wrote the play The Cake Man in the prison
- Michael Murdoch, convicted in the murder of Anita Cobby
