= Minister for Corrections (New South Wales) =

- Incumbent; Anoulack Chanthivong since 5 April 2023
- Department of Communities and Justice
- Style: The Honourable
- Nominator: Premier of New South Wales
- Appointer: Governor of New South Wales
- Inaugural holder: Bill Haigh (as the Minister for Corrective Services)
- Formation: 30 January 2017

The New South Wales Minister for Corrections is a minister of the Government of New South Wales who is commissioned with responsibility for the administration of correctional services, juvenile justice, and prisons in the state of New South Wales, Australia.

The current Minister for Corrections is Anoulack Chanthivong, since 5 April 2023. The minister administers the portfolio through the Department of Communities and Justice cluster, in particular through the Department of Communities and Justice, a department of the Government of New South Wales, and additional agencies.

Ultimately the minister is answerable to Parliament of New South Wales.

== List of ministers ==
Title	Minister	Party	Term start	Term end	Time in office	Notes
Minister for Corrective Services	Bill Haigh	Labor	19 October 1978	2 October 1981	2 years, 348 days	
Minister for Corrective Services	Rex Jackson	Labor	2 October 1981	27 October 1983	2 years, 25 days	
Minister for Corrective Services	Peter Anderson	Labor	27 October 1983	5 April 1984	161 days	
Minister for Corrective Services	John Akister	Labor	5 April 1984	21 March 1988	3 years, 351 days	
Minister for Corrective Services	Ray Aston	Liberal	25 March 1988	23 May 1988	63 days	
Minister for Corrective Services	John Fahey	Liberal	23 May 1988	8 June 1988	16 days	
Minister for Corrective Services	Michael Yabsley	Liberal	8 June 1988	6 June 1991	2 years, 363 days	
Minister for Courts Administration and Corrective Services	Terry Griffiths	Liberal	6 June 1991	28 June 1991	22 days	
Minister for Corrective Services	Bob Debus	Labor	4 April 1995	12 January 2001	5 years, 283 days	
Minister for Corrective Services	John Watkins	Labor	12 January 2001	21 November 2001	313 days	
Minister for Corrective Services	Richard Amery	Labor	21 November 2001	2 April 2003	1 year, 132 days	
Minister for Corrective Services	John Robertson	Labor	30 January 2009	4 December 2009	308 days	
Minister for Corrective Services	Phil Costa	Labor	8 December 2009	28 March 2011	1 year, 110 days	
Minister for Corrections	David Elliott	Liberal	2 April 2015	23 March 2019	3 years, 355 days	
Minister for Counter Terrorism and Corrections	Anthony Roberts	Liberal	2 April 2019	21 December 2021	2 years, 263 days	
Minister for Corrections	Geoff Lee	Liberal	21 December 2021	28 March 2023	4 years, 332 days	The minister administers the portfolio through the Stronger Communities cluster, in particular through the Department of Communities and Justice, a department of the Government of New South Wales, and additional agencies.
Minister for Corrections	Anoulack Chanthivong	Labor	5 April 2023	incumbent	3 years, 227 days	

== Former ministerial titles ==
=== Counter Terrorism ===
Title	Minister	Party	Term start	Term end	Time in office	Notes
Minister for Counter Terrorism; Minister for Corrections	David Elliott	Liberal	30 January 2017	2 April 2019	2 years, 62 days	
Minister for Counter Terrorism and Corrections	Anthony Roberts	Liberal	2 April 2019	21 December 2021	2 years, 263 days	
Minister for Mental Health	Ryan Park	Labor	28 March 2023	5 April 2023	8 days	
Minister for Police and Counter-terrorism	Yasmin Catley	Labor	5 April 2023	incumbent	3 years, 227 days	

=== Justice ===
Title	Minister	Party	Term start	Term end	Time in office	Notes
Minister of Justice and Public Instruction	George Allen MLA	None	9 December 1873	8 February 1875	1 year, 61 days	
Minister of Justice and Public Instruction	Joseph Docker MLC	None	9 February 1875	21 March 1877	2 years, 40 days	
Minister of Justice and Public Instruction	Francis Suttor MLA	None	22 March 1877	16 August 1877	147 days	
Minister of Justice and Public Instruction	John Lackey MLA	None	17 August 1877	17 December 1877	122 days	
Minister of Justice and Public Instruction	Joseph Leary MLA	None	18 December 1877	20 December 1878	1 year, 2 days	
Minister of Justice and Public Instruction	Francis Suttor	None	21 December 1878	30 April 1880	1 year, 131 days	
Minister of Justice	Francis Suttor	None	1 May 1880	10 August 1880	101 days	
Minister of Justice	Sir Joseph Innes	None	11 August 1880	13 October 1881	63 days	
Minister of Justice	William Foster	None	14 October 1881	4 January 1883	1 year, 82 days	
Minister of Justice	Henry Cohen	None	5 January 1883	6 October 1885	2 years, 274 days	
Minister of Justice	James Farnell	None	7 October 1885	9 October 1885	2 days	
Minister of Justice	Thomas Slattery	None	2 November 1885	21 December 1885	49 days	
Minister of Justice	Louis Heydon	None	22 December 1885	4 February 1886	44 days	
Minister of Justice	James Garvan	Protectionist	26 February 1886	19 January 1887	327 days	
Minister of Justice	William Clarke	Free Trade	20 January 1887	16 January 1889	1 year, 362 days	
Minister of Justice	Thomas Slattery	Protectionist	17 January 1889	7 March 1889	49 days	
Minister of Justice	Albert Gould	Free Trade	8 March 1889	22 October 1891	2 years, 228 days	
Minister of Justice	Richard O'Connor	Protectionist	23 October 1891	14 December 1893	2 years, 52 days	
Minister of Justice	Thomas Slattery	Protectionist	15 December 1893	2 August 1894	230 days	
Minister of Justice	Albert Gould	Free Trade	3 August 1894	15 August 1898	4 years, 12 days	
Minister of Justice	Charles Lee	Free Trade	17 August 1898	3 July 1899	320 days	
Minister of Justice	John Hughes	Free Trade	3 July 1899	13 September 1899	72 days	
Minister of Justice	William Wood	Protectionist	14 September 1899	9 April 1901	1 year, 207 days	
Minister of Justice	Robert Fitzgerald	Progressive	11 April 1901	16 July 1901	96 days	
Minister of Justice	Bernhard Wise (Note: Bernhard Wise was the Attorney General and took on the additional responsibilities following the electoral defeat of Robert Fitzgerald.)	Progressive	22 July 1901	14 June 1904	2 years, 328 days	
Minister of Justice	Thomas Waddell	Progressive	15 June 1904	29 August 1904	75 days	
Minister of Justice	Charles Wade	Liberal Reform	29 August 1904	20 December 1909	5 years, 113 days	
Minister of Justice	John Garland	Liberal Reform	21 December 1909	20 October 1910	303 days	
Minister of Justice	William Holman	Labor	21 October 1910	1 April 1912	1 year, 163 days	
Minister of Justice	David Hall	Labor	2 April 1912	15 November 1916	4 years, 227 days	
Minister of Justice	John Garland	Nationalist	15 November 1916	23 July 1919	2 years, 250 days	
Minister of Justice	Jack FitzGerald	Nationalist	23 July 1919	12 April 1920	264 days	
Minister of Justice	Edward McTiernan	Labor	12 April 1920	21 December 1920	253 days	
Minister of Justice	William McKell (Note: William McKell was appointed as a Minister without Portfolio to be Assistant Minister of Justice from 12 April 1920, and appointed Minister on 22 December 1920.)	Labor	22 December 1920	10 October 1921	292 days	
Minister of Justice	Thomas Bavin	Nationalist	20 December 1921	20 December 1921	7 hours	
Minister of Justice	William McKell	Labor	20 December 1921	13 April 1922	114 days	
Minister of Justice	Thomas Ley	Nationalist	13 April 1922	17 June 1925	3 years, 65 days	
Minister of Justice	William McKell	Labor	17 June 1925	7 June 1927	1 year, 355 days	
Minister of Justice	Andrew Lysaght	Labor	8 June 1927	18 October 1927	132 days	
Minister for Justice	John Lee	Nationalist	18 October 1927	3 November 1930	3 years, 16 days	
Minister for Justice	Joseph Lamaro	Labor	4 November 1930	17 June 1931	225 days	
Minister for Justice	William McKell	Labor	17 June 1931	13 May 1932	331 days	
Minister for Justice	Sir Daniel Levy	United Australia	16 May 1932	17 June 1932	32 days	
Minister for Justice	Lewis Martin	United Australia	18 June 1932	16 August 1939	7 years, 59 days	
Minister for Justice	Vernon Treatt	United Australia	16 August 1939	16 May 1941	1 year, 273 days	
Minister for Justice	Reg Downing	Labor	19 May 1941	31 May 1960	19 years, 12 days	
Minister for Justice	Jack Mannix	Labor	31 May 1960	13 May 1965	4 years, 347 days	
Minister for Justice	John Maddison	Liberal	13 May 1965	11 May 1976	10 years, 364 days	
Minister for Justice	Ron Mulock	Labor	14 May 1976	19 October 1978	2 years, 158 days	
Minister for Justice	Frank Walker	Labor	19 October 1978	1 February 1983	4 years, 105 days	
Minister for Justice	Paul Landa	Labor	1 February 1983	5 April 1984	1 year, 64 days	
Minister for Justice	Terry Griffiths (Note: Known for 22 days as the Minister for Courts Administration and Corrective Services.)	Liberal	28 June 1991	23 September 1992	1 year, 87 days	
Minister for Justice	Ted Pickering	Liberal	23 September 1992	22 October 1992	29 days	
Minister for Justice	Wayne Merton	Liberal	22 October 1992	26 May 1993	216 days	
Minister for Justice	John Hannaford	Liberal	26 May 1993	4 April 1995	1 year, 313 days	
Minister for Justice	John Hatzistergos	Labor	2 April 2003	3 August 2005	2 years, 123 days	
Minister for Justice	Tony Kelly	Labor	3 August 2005	2 April 2007	1 year, 242 days	
Minister for Justice	John Hatzistergos	Labor	2 April 2007	30 January 2009	1 year, 303 days	
Minister for Justice	Greg Smith	Liberal	3 April 2011	17 April 2014	3 years, 14 days	
Minister for Justice	Brad Hazzard	Liberal	23 April 2014	2 April 2015	344 days	
Minister for Justice and Police	Troy Grant	National	2 April 2015	30 January 2017	1 year, 303 days	

=== Youth Justice ===
Title	Minister	Party	Term start	Term end	Time in office	Notes
Minister for Juvenile Justice	Carmel Tebbutt	Labor	8 April 1999	2 April 2003	3 years, 359 days	
Minister for Juvenile Justice	Diane Beamer	Labor	2 April 2003	3 August 2005	2 years, 123 days	
Minister for Juvenile Justice	Tony Kelly	Labor	3 August 2005	2 April 2007	1 year, 242 days	
Minister for Juvenile Justice	John Hatzistergos	Labor	2 April 2007	11 April 2007	9 days	
Minister for Juvenile Justice	Barbara Perry	Labor	11 April 2007	5 September 2008	1 year, 147 days	
Minister for Juvenile Justice	Graham West	Labor	8 September 2008	5 June 2010	1 year, 270 days	
Minister for Juvenile Justice	Barbara Perry	Labor	5 June 2010	28 March 2011	296 days	
Minister for Mental Health	Ryan Park	Labor	28 March 2023	5 April 2023	8 days	
Minister for Youth Justice	Jihad Dib	Labor	5 April 2023	present	3 years, 227 days	

== See also ==
- List of New South Wales government agencies
- Justice ministry
- Politics of New South Wales
- Minister for Corrections (Victoria)
