= Tony Vinson =

Australian social scientist (1935–2017)

Tony Vinson AM
- Born: Phillippe Anthony Vinson; 11 November 1935; Australia
- Died: 17 February 2017 (aged 81); Woollahra, New South Wales, Australia
- Occupations: Academic and writer
- Writing career
- Period: 1962–2017
- Subjects: Disadvantage, Penal Systems, Education
- Notable work: Vinson Inquiry into State Education in New South Wales

Tony Vinson AM (11 November 1935 – 17 February 2017) was an Australian academic, regarded as "one of Australia's leading social scientists and outspoken public intellectuals". His career spanned the disciplines of social work, social policy, psychology, education, public administration and social research.

== Career ==
Vinson's long and diverse career in social research, education, government services, prison reform, and community development, has included many projects on social disadvantage and young people. Vinson has also studied the impact of cumulative medico-social problems and life opportunities generally. The determinative influence of education (or life prospects) has remained a theme in this strand of his research, culminating in the recent publication of an influential study on the distribution of social disadvantage in Victoria and New South Wales.

His work as the Foundation Professor in Behavioural science within the University of Newcastle (NSW) in the 1970s followed research into connections between social factors, and pregnancy outcomes, including the health and progress of young children. At Newcastle, an important educational experience was his involvement in the development of the problem-based learning approach adopted for the new medical course. This approach incorporated many of the key elements of the educational approach considered as somewhat radical departures in the field of school education. Vinson also instigated the broadly based admission procedures adopted by the medical faculty.

Following three years as Head of the NSW Department of Corrective Services (1979–81) during a period of intense penal reform, Vinson took up an appointment as Professor of Social Work at the University of New South Wales. Over subsequent years he served as Head of School and Dean. He was a visiting professor at the Stockholm University twice, and observed the operation of Swedish social services, including early schooling. He also had Visiting Professor appointments in the Netherlands and government consultancies in the South Pacific. In 1980, Vinson chaired a Commonwealth Government Inquiry into health and social services in the ACT.

Vinson has had an extensive involvement in assessing schemes to protect children exposed to the dangers of abuse. Some of these projects included the evaluation of professional practices, including the co-operation of schools with government and non-government services. Others dealt with the social contexts and environments in which abusive practices occur. This work has been published internationally in journals such as the British Journal of Social Work and Modern Medicine as well as within Australia by the Institute of Criminology and other authorities.

On Vinson's initiative, the UNSW School of Social Work, in partnership with the NSW Department of Housing, residents, and local community bodies, formed a community development centre on the Waterloo Housing Estate. Vinson had the title Professor Emeritus conferred on him by the University of New South Wales.

=== Tony Vinson Centre for Community Development ===
This purpose-built community centre in Mildura, named after Vinson is designed to co-locate agency programs Chances for Children, Reading Discovery, Learning for Life, The Portland House Project and the proposed Youth Engagement Program for Early years. It opened in 2008.

=== The Vinson Inquiry ===
The Vinson Inquiry was commissioned by the New South Wales Teachers Federation and the Federation of Parents and Citizens Associations in 2002 to consider the state of public education in New South Wales and provide recommendations for the future. The inquiry visited and conducted public hearings at schools and TAFE colleges throughout the state.

The recommendations of the inquiry caused controversy, in a large part due to its recommendation that the number of academically selective high schools and opportunity classes be significantly reduced. However, despite support for the report from the Education Minister John Watkins, most of the recommendations, including those on academically selective education, were not acted upon.

=== Dropping off the Edge ===
Dropping off the Edge: the distribution of disadvantage in Australia was the most comprehensive national study of its kind. The report, which is a joint project with Jesuit Social Services and Catholic Social Services Australia was written by Vinson, providing a picture of areas of entrenched disadvantage nationally. The report found that just 1.7 per cent of postcodes and communities across Australia accounted for more than seven times their share of top rank positions on the major factors that cause intergenerational poverty. Vinson said:

"Our findings demand recognition of a common pattern associated with inadequate education and training–unemployment, low income, poor health and 'making ends meet' by criminal means, resulting in high rates of convictions and imprisonment. Where these characteristics are concentrated there, too, we find high levels of confirmed child maltreatment."

=== Judicial accountability ===
In September 1986, Vinson released a report dealing with the sentencing of drug cases in the NSW District Court between 1980 and 1982, which purported to find that a particular judge had exercised leniency in dealing with clients of a particular solicitor. It was revealed later that Judge John Foord was the judge in question. He was stood down from the District Court in September 1986 and resigned on medical grounds later that year. One consequence of these and other events was the passing of the Judicial Officers Act 1986, establishing a formalised system of judicial accountability.

=== Australian Social Inclusion Board ===
On 21 May 2008, Vinson was announced as a founding member of the Australian Social Inclusion Board, which brought together leaders from around the country to tackle disadvantage.

=== Other work ===
- 1962–69 Tutor, lecturer, School of Sociology and Social Work, University of New South Wales.
- 1969–71 Senior Lecturer, Department of Social Work, University of Sydney.
- 1971–76 Foundation Director, Bureau of Crime Statistics and Research, NSW Department of Attorney General and Justice – undertaking wide-ranging social as well as criminological research.
- 1976–79 Foundation Professor of Behavioural Science in Medicine, University of Newcastle.
- 1979–81 chairman, NSW Corrective Services Commission
- Oct 1981– Professor, School of Social Work, University of New South Wales.

Vinson once wrote a jazz single which was aired on ABC radio.

== Honours and awards ==
Vinson was appointed a Member (AM) of the Order of Australia in the Australia Day honours list 2008 for service to social welfare through academic, government and community roles, as a contributor to state and federal policy formulation, and as a champion of social justice.

Vinson was awarded an honorary Doctor of Letters in Social Work (honoris causa) from the University of Sydney, as well as being an Honorary Professor in the School of Social Work and Policy Studies at the University of Sydney from which he graduated in 1956. He is also an Emeritus Professor of the University of New South Wales.

== Death ==
Vinson died at Woollahra, New South Wales on 17 February 2017.

== Academic qualifications ==
- B.A., Dip. Soc. Studies (Sydney) 1956
- Dip. Sociology (N.S.W.) 1962
- M.A. Hons. (N.S.W.) 1965
- PhD (N.S.W.) 1972: Thesis – Social Factors Associated with the Occurrence of Low Birth Weight

=== Academic appointments ===
- Australian Social Welfare Commission Fellowship, April/June 1976 (University of Newcastle).
- Visiting Professor, Stockholm University January – March 1985; March – July 1988.
- Visiting Professor, Research Centre, Ministry of Justice, Netherlands, April – July 1985, February 1988.
- Editor Board, Scandinavian Journal of Social Welfare, 1991 –

== Selected published works ==
- Vinson, T; Homel, R (1977). Indicators of Community Wellbeing. Canberra: Australian Government Publishing Service.
- Vinson, T; Homel, R (January 1975). "Crime and Disadvantage: The Coincidence of Medical and Social Problems in an Australian City". British Journal of Criminology. 15 (1). doi:10.1093/oxfordjournals.bjc.a046607.
- Vinson, T; Homel, R; Bonney, R (1976). A Community Study: Newcastle, Community Services: Four Studies. Canberra: Poverty Commission, Australian Government Publishing Service.
- Vinson, T; Stevens, L.A (1977). Unequal at Birth: A Study of Social Factors Associated with Low Weight Births. Sydney: New South Wales Government Printer.
- Vinson, T; Walmsley, R; Coul, V (1984). Beyond the Image. Review of Health and Welfare Services and Policies in the ACT. Canberra: Australian Government Printing Service.
- Vinson, T; McArthur, M (September 1988). "Why Child Abuse Appears to have Increased". Modern Medicine: 62–73.
- Vinson, T; Baldry, E; Hargreaves, J. "The Social Ecology of Child Abuse". British Journal of Social Work.
- Vinson, T. "Preparing Human Service Professionals for work in the fields of gender related violence". Scandinavian Journal of Social Welfare.

Tony Vinson has been published in a range of international, referred journals including British Journal of Criminology, British Journal of Social Work, Anglo-American Law Review, Journal of APLET, Scandinavian Journal of Social Welfare, Australian and New Zealand Journal of Sociology.
