= Department of Communities and Justice =

Government department of New South Wales, Australia

Department overview
- Formed: 1 July 2019; 7 years ago
- Preceding agencies: Department of Family and Community Services; Department of Justice
- Jurisdiction: New South Wales
- Headquarters: 6 Parramatta Square, 10 Darcy Street, Parramatta, New South Wales, Australia
- Ministers responsible: The Hon. Michael Daley SC, MP, Attorney General; The Hon. Yasmin Catley MP, Minister for Police and Counter-terrorism; The Hon. David Harris MP, Minister for Veterans; The Hon. Jodie Harrison MP, Minister for the Prevention of Domestic Violence and Sexual Assault; The Hon. Anoulack Chanthivong MP, Minister for Corrections; The Hon. Kate Washington MP, Minister for Families and Communities; Minister for Disability Inclusion
- Deputy Ministers responsible: The Hon. Jihad Dib MP, Minister for Emergency Services; The Hon. Steve Kamper MP, Minister for Multiculturalism; Minister for Seniors
- Department executive: Michael Tidball, Secretary
- Website: www.dcj.nsw.gov.au

The Department of Communities and Justice (DCJ), a department of the Government of New South Wales, is responsible for the delivery of services to some of the most disadvantaged individuals, families and communities; and the administration and development of a just and equitable legal system of courts, tribunals, laws and other mechanisms that further the principles of justice in the state of New South Wales, Australia. It also provides services to children and young people, families, people who are homeless, people with a disability, their families and carers, women, and older people. The department is the lead agency of the Stronger Communities cluster of the New South Wales government.

The department was formed on 1 July 2019 following the 2019 state election that saw the formation of the second Berejiklian ministry. The department assumed most of functions from the former Department of Family and Community Services, and the former Department of Justice. The new department was originally meant to be named Department of Family, Community Services and Justice when announced on the gazette in April 2019, but was changed to its current name in June 2019.

== Governing legislation ==
Adult correctional operations are governed by the Crimes (Administration of Sentences) Act 1999. Other relevant laws include the Crimes (Sentencing Procedure) Act 1999 (NSW), Crimes Act 1900 No 40 (NSW), Crimes (Interstate Transfer of Community Based Sentences) Act 2004 (NSW), Protected Disclosures Act 1994 No 92 (NSW), Summary Offences Act 1988 No 25 (NSW), Prisoners (Interstate Transfer) Act 1982 No 104 (NSW), and Parole Orders (Transfer) Act 1983 No 190 (NSW).

Juvenile justice operates under the terms of the Children (Detention Centres) Act 1987 (NSW), the Children (Community Service Orders) Act 1987 (NSW), the Young Offenders Act 1997 (NSW), and the Children (Interstate Transfer of Offenders) Act 1988 (NSW).

== Structure ==
DCJ is made up of seven divisions, including:

- Courts, Tribunals and Service Delivery, which supports the work of the State's Supreme Court and subordinate courts and tribunals
- Corrections, which manages prisons and supervises offenders in the community, such as parolees and those sentenced to community service
- Child Protection and Permanency, District and Youth Justice Services, which manages child protection, foster care, adoption and juvenile detention centres
- Housing, Disability and District Services and Emergency Management, which provides services to people experiencing homelessness or disability, and communities facing natural disasters
- Law Reform and Legal Services, which includes the State's Director of Public Prosecutions

These are supported by a Strategy, Policy and Commissioning and a Corporate Services division.

Each division is led by a deputy secretary (the deputy secretary for Corrections is known as the Commissioner of Corrective Services). The deputy secretaries report to the secretary, which is currently vacant and filled on an acting basis by Catherine D’Elia.

=== Ministers ===
The following ministers are responsible for the administration of the department and its agencies:

- Attorney General
- Minister for Police and Counter-terrorism
- Minister for Veterans
- Minister for the Prevention of Domestic Violence and Sexual Assault
- Minister for Corrections
- Minister for Families and Communities
- Minister for Disability Inclusion
- Minister for Emergency Services
- Minister for Multiculturalism
- Minister for Seniors

All ministers were appointed with effect from 5 April 2023. Ultimately the ministers are responsible to the Parliament of New South Wales.

=== Agencies administered ===
The following agencies are administered by the department:

- Crown Solicitor's Office
- Disability Council of New South Wales
- Fire and Rescue NSW
- Home and Community Care Program Advisory Committee
- Home Care Service of NSW
- NSW Civil and Administrative Tribunal
- Information and Privacy Commission
- Inspector of Custodial Services
- Legal Aid NSW
- Multicultural NSW Staff Agency
- NSW Businesslink Pty Ltd
- NSW Government Telecommunications Authority
- New South Wales Police Force
- New South Wales Crime Commission
- NSW Registry of Births Deaths & Marriages
- New South Wales Rural Fire Service
- NSW Trustee and Guardian
- Office of the Director of Public Prosecutions
- Office of the Sheriff of New South Wales
- New South Wales State Emergency Service

== See also ==
- List of New South Wales government agencies
