= List of prisons in Australia =

This is a list of operational and former Australian prisons for adult males and females and youth detention centres for juveniles. Prisons listed as "museum" are former prisons that are now open for public inspection and tours.

Throughout the European history of Australia, particularly since its formation as a penal colony, Australia has had many establishments for rehabilitation and incarceration. Altogether, there have been more than 180+ rehabilitation centres, youth correctional centres and prisons in Australia.

== Australian Capital Territory ==
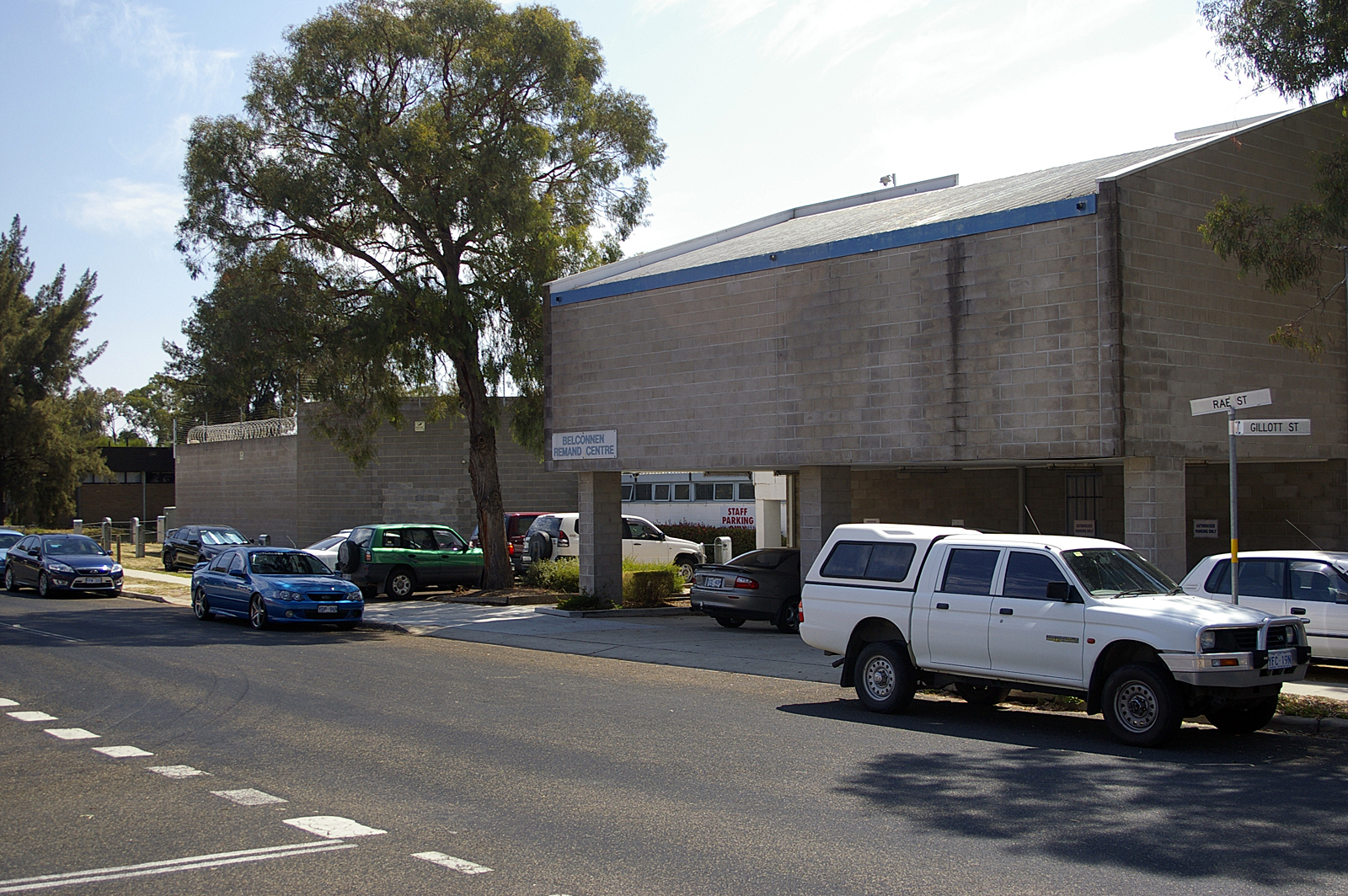
Belconnen Remand Centre

A new prison was opened on 11 September 2008 at Hume, called the Alexander Maconochie Centre, named after Alexander Maconochie. The centre is designed as a multi role facility to replace the Belconnen Remand Centre and provide detention facilities so that prisoners who are currently held in New South Wales facilities may be held locally.

Prisons in the Australian Capital Territory
Prison	Status	Classification	Managed	Opened	Closed	Capacity	Location
Alexander Maconochie Centre	Operational	Minimum to maximum	ACT Corrective Services	11 September 2008	No	300	Hume
Belconnen Remand Centre	Closed	Maximum Demolished in 2015–2016	ACT Corrective Services	1986	30 April 2009	60	Belconnen
Bimberi Youth Justice Centre	Operational		ACT Community Services	3 September 2008	No	40	Mitchell
Periodic Detention Centre	Operational	Minimum	ACT Corrective Services	1962	No	49	Symonston
Symonston Correctional Centre	Operational		ACT Corrective Services	?	No	22	Symonston
Total capacity						411	(current)

== New South Wales ==
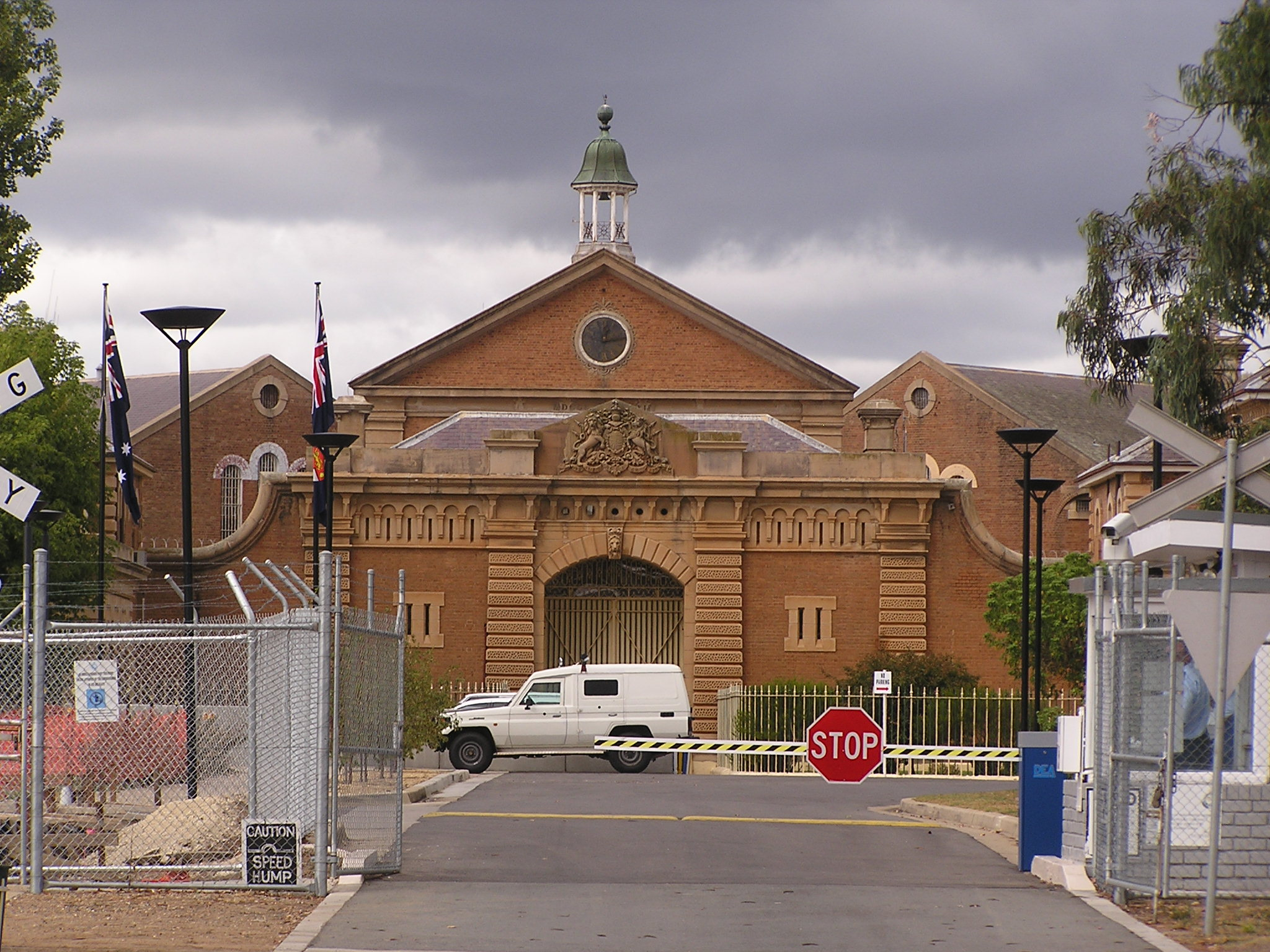
Main entrance of Goulburn Correctional Centre, with buildings designed by the Colonial Architect, James Barnet in 1884

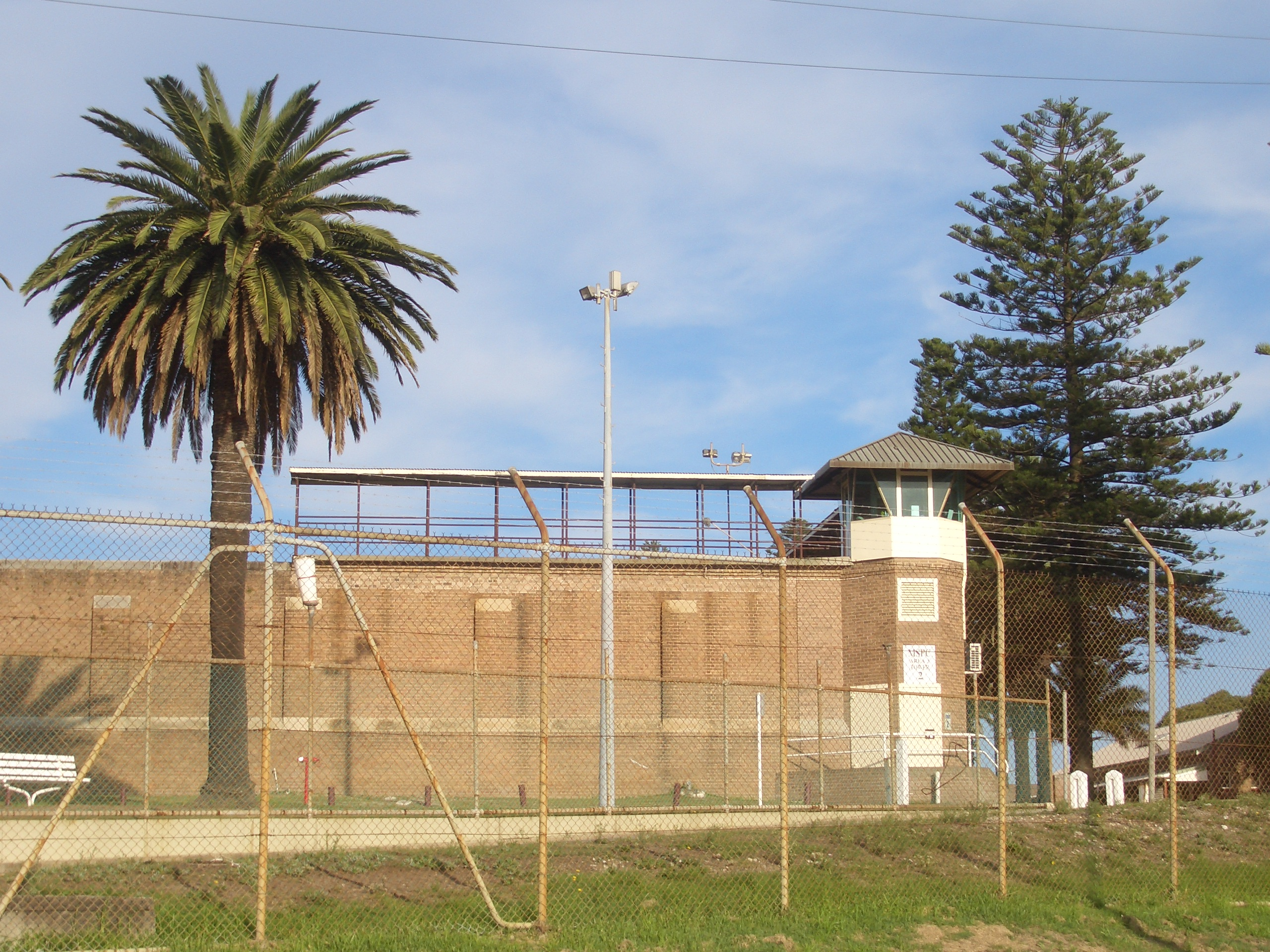
Watch tower at Long Bay Correctional Centre at Malabar.

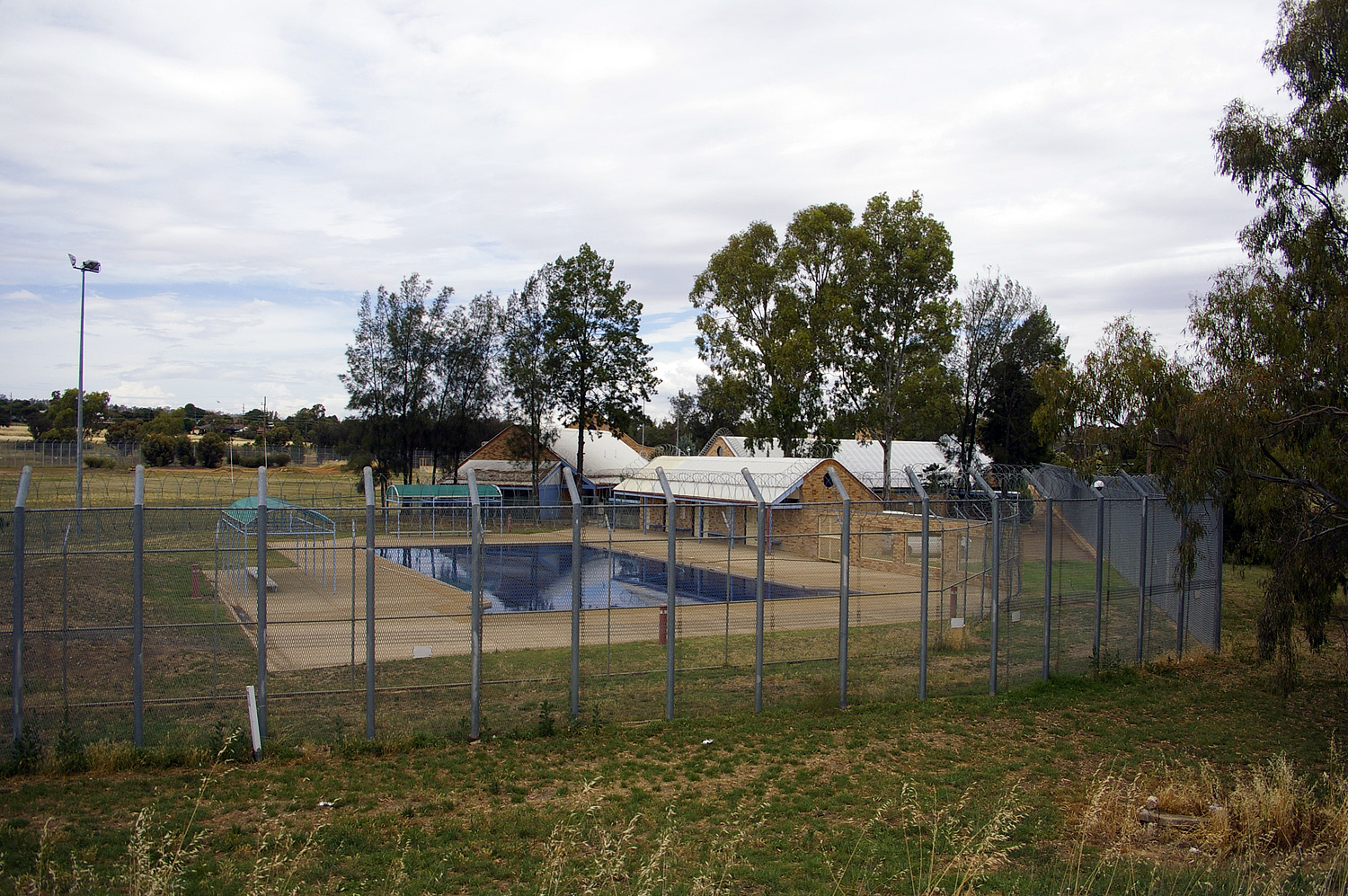
Riverina Juvenile Justice Centre in Wagga Wagga.

The following list of operational and closed correctional facilities has been sourced from the Corrective Services NSW and from the State Records archives.

Prisons in New South Wales
Prison	Status	Classification	Managed	Opened	Closed	Capacity	Location
Acmena Juvenile Justice Centre	Operational	?	Youth Justice NSW	1998	n/a	45	Grafton
Albury Gaol	Closed	Demolished in 1947	n/a	14 August 1874	4 June 1943	?	Albury
Armidale Gaol	Closed	Demolished in 1929	n/a	14 August 1874	25 June 1920	?	Armidale
Balranald Gaol	Museum	?	n/a	25 August 1887	1 August 1932	?	Balranald
Bathurst Correctional Centre	Operational	Minimum to maximum	Corrective Services NSW	14 August 1874	n/a	650	Bathurst
Bega Gaol	Closed	?	n/a	14 August 1874	1 May 1940	?	Bega
Berrima Gaol	Closed	Minimum	n/a	1839	2020	?	Berrima
Biloela Gaol (Convict Precinct)	Events venue	?	Sydney Harbour Federation Trust	June 1888	1908	?	Cockatoo Island
Bombala Gaol	Closed	Most probably demolished	n/a	26 January 1892	30 November 1939	?	Bombala
Braidwood Gaol	Closed	In state of ruins	n/a	14 August 1874	16 August 1909	?	Braidwood
Brewarrina (Yetta Dhinnakkal) Centre	Operational	Minimum	Corrective Services NSW	2000	n/a	70	Brewarrina
Broken Hill Correctional Centre (initially as Silverton Gaol)	Operational	Medium	Corrective Services NSW	12 May 1891	n/a	89	Broken Hill
Broken Hill Juvenile Justice Centre	Operational	?	Youth Justice NSW	?	?	?	Broken Hill
Burrowa Gaol (or maybe Boorowa Gaol)	Closed	?	n/a	1 January 1889	5 December 1904	?	Boorowa
Cessnock Correctional Centre	Operational	Minimum to maximum	Correctional Services NSW	1972	n/a	750	Cessnock
Clarence Correctional Centre	Operational	Minimum to maximum	Serco	25 July 2020	n/a	1,700	near Grafton
Cobham Juvenile Justice Centre	Operational	?	Youth Justice NSW	June 1980	n/a	105	St Marys
Condobolin Gaol	Closed	?	n/a	13 January 1902	1 December 1905	?	Condobolin
Cooma Correctional Centre	Operational+ museum	Minimum to medium (males and females)	Corrective Services NSW	1 November 1873^{a}	n/a^{a}	160	Cooma
Coonabarabran Gaol	Closed	?	n/a	2 October 1878	1 January 1903	?	Coonabarabran
Cootamundra Gaol	Closed	?	n/a	25 November 1886	31 August 1935	?	Cootamundra
Darlinghurst Gaol	Closed	?	National Art School	1822	1914	?	Darlinghurst
Defence Force Correctional Establishment	Operational	?	Australian Defence Force	1989	n/a	22	Holsworthy Barracks
Deniliquin Gaol	Closed	Demolished in 1966	n/a	14 August 1874	15 November 1935	?	Deniliquin
Dillwynia Correctional Centre	Operational	Minimum/ medium	Corrective Services NSW	2003	n/a	200	Windsor
Dubbo Gaol	Museum & events venue	?	Commonwealth of Australia	1847	26 August 1966	?	Dubbo
Emu Plains Correctional Centre	Operational	Minimum	Corrective Services NSW	December 1914	n/a	190	Emu Plains
Fort Denison	Museum	Maximum	NSW National Parks & Wildlife Service	1788	1838	?	Sydney Harbour
Frank Baxter Juvenile Justice Centre	Operational	?	Youth Justice NSW	October 1999	?	120	Kariong
Glen Innes Correctional Centre	Operational	Minimum	Corrective Services NSW	15 August 1928	n/a	95	Glen Innes
Goulburn Correctional Centre	Operational	Minimum to maximum; supermax	Corrective Services NSW	14 August 1874	n/a	650	Goulburn
Grafton Gaol	Closed	Medium	Corrective Services NSW	1893	2020	?	Grafton
Grenfell Gaol	Closed	?	Corrective Services NSW	1 January 1877	1 January 1905	?	Grenfell
Gundagai Gaol	Closed	Minimum	Corrective Services NSW	1859	1909	?	Gundagai
Hay Gaol	Closed	Museum, picnic ground and events venue	Corrective Services NSW	14 August 1874	31 October 1947	?	Hay
Ivanhoe (Warakirri) Correctional Centre	Operational	Minimum	Corrective Services NSW	2000	n/a	50	Ivanhoe
John Morony Correctional Centre	Operational	Minimum to maximum	?	1991		400	Windsor
Junee Correctional Centre	Operational	Medium	GEO Group Australia	1993	n/a	790 adult males	Junee
Juniperina Juvenile Justice Centre	Operational	?	Youth Justice NSW	2005	n/a	?	Lidcombe
Kariong Youth Correctional Centre	Operational	?	Corrective Services NSW	1991	n/a	100	Kariong
Keelong Juvenile Justice Centre	Closed	Youth centre	Youth Justice NSW	1978	2009	?	Unanderra
Kempsey Gaol (opened as West Kempsey Gaol)	Closed	Most likely demolished	n/a	1 January 1884	31 December 1941		West Kempsey
Kirkconnell Correctional Centre	Operational	Minimum	Corrective Services NSW	28 November 1958	No	250	Sunny Corner
Leslie Nott Afforestation Camp, Laurel Hill	Closed	Minimum	n/a	18 March 1957	23 June 1995	?	Laurel Hill
Lithgow Correctional Centre	Operational	Maximum	Corrective Services NSW	1990	n/a	460	Lithgow
Long Bay Correctional Centre	Operational	Maximum	Corrective Services NSW	1909	n/a	1,100	Sydney
Maitland Gaol^{b}	Museum	Maximum	Corrective Services NSW	1848	28 January 1998	400	Maitland
Mannus Correctional Centre	Operational	Minimum	Corrective Services NSW	1930	n/a	164	Tumbarumba
Metropolitan Remand and Reception Centre (MRRC)	Operational	Maximum	Corrective Services NSW	1997	n/a	1,050	Silverwater
Mid North Coast Correctional Centre	Operational	Minimum to medium	Corrective Services NSW	2004	n/a	500	Aldavilla
Mudgee Gaol	Closed	Most likely demolished	Corrective Services NSW	14 August 1874	11 August 1909		Mudgee
Narrabri Gaol	Museum	?	Narrabri Historical Society	1880–1882	2 November 1982		Narrabri
Oberon Correctional Centre	Operational	Minimum		1930	n/a	100	Oberon
Orana Juvenile Justice Centre	Operational	?	Youth Justice NSW	2000	?	45	Dubbo
Parklea Correctional Centre	Operational	Maximum & a minimum area	GEO Group Australia	1983	n/a	893	Parklea
Parramatta Gaol	Museum	Medium	?	1798	2011	580	Parramatta
Port Macquarie Gaol	Closed	Demolished	n/a	Between 1837 and 1840	1920		Port Macquarie
Reiby Juvenile Justice Centre	Operational	?	Youth Justice NSW	August 1973	n/a	55	Airds
Riverina Juvenile Justice Centre	Operational	?	Youth Justice NSW	1984	n/a	45	Wagga Wagga
Silverwater Correctional Centre	Operational	Minimum	Corrective Services NSW	?	n/a	?	Silverwater
Silverwater Women's Correctional Centre	Operational	Minimum	Corrective Services NSW	1970	n/a	200	Silverwater
South Coast Correctional Centre	Operational	Minimum to Maximum	Corrective Services NSW	2010	n/a	549	Nowra Hill
St Heliers Correctional Centre	Operational	Minimum	Corrective Services NSW	1990	n/a	280	Muswellbrook
Tamworth Correctional Centre	Operational	Medium	Corrective Services NSW	1991	n/a	90	Tamworth
Taree Gaol	Closed	Demolished	Corrective Services NSW	15 December 1884	31 October 1940		Taree
Trial Bay Gaol	Museum	?	Corrective Services NSW	1886	1918		Arakoon
Tuncurry Afforestation Camp	Closed	Demolished	Corrective Services NSW	26 October 1913	1 April 1938		Tuncurry
Wagga Wagga Gaol	Closed	Demolished in 1919	Corrective Services NSW	1863	11 August 1909		Wagga Wagga
Wellington Correctional Centre	Operational	Maximum	Corrective Services NSW	2007	n/a	700	Wellington
Wentworth Gaol	School then to Museum	?	n/a	Built in 1879–1881	1927		Wentworth
Windsor Gaol	Closed	Demolished in 1936	n/a	14 August 1874	17 January 1899		Windsor
Wollongong Gaol	Closed	Demolished after WWI	n/a	14 August 1874	31 October 1915		Wollongong
Wyalong Gaol	Closed	Most probably demolished	n/a	1 February 1899	16 August 1909		Wyalong
Yarrangobilly Gaol	Closed	?	n/a	2 November 1966	21 July 1993		Yarrangobilly
Yasmar Juvenile Justice Centre	Closed	?	Youth Justice NSW	1981	2006	36	Ashfield
Yass Gaol	Closed	Most probably demolished	n/a	1 September 1883	16 August 1909		Yass
Young Gaol	Closed	Much of the gaol was demolished in 1934 and the remains (mainly the arched gateway) were incorporated into Young's new technical college.	n/a	14 August 1874	1 August 1923		Young
Total capacity						4,927	(known)

^a Cooma commenced operations on 1 November 1873 with 31 cells. In 1876 it was reduced to a Police Gaol and then a temporary Lunatic Asylum in 1877. The Centre closed temporarily in the early 1900s. The Gaol reopened on 8 March 1957 and was again closed 10 July 1998. Cooma Correctional Centre reopened for the second time in November 2001.
^b Maitland, now closed, had capacity for 400 inmates at its peak.

== Northern Territory ==
Prisons in the Northern Territory
Prison	Status	Classification	Managed	Opened	Closed	Capacity	Location
Alice Springs Correctional Centre	Operational	Maximum	Northern Territory Correctional Services	1996	–	470	Alice Springs
Alice Springs Juvenile Holding Centre	Operational	Maximum	Northern Territory Correctional Services	September 1998	–	10	Alice Springs
Berrimah Prison	Closed (Note: Facilities within the prison were repurposed for use by Don Dale Youth Detention Centre. Adult prisoners were transferred to the Darwin Correctional Centre.)	Maximum	Northern Territory Correctional Services	1 September 1979	28 November 2014	750	Berrimah
Don Dale Youth Detention Centre	Operational	Maximum	Department of Territory Families, Housing and Communities	1989	–	38	Berrimah
Darwin Correctional Centre	Operational	Minimum to maximum	Northern Territory Correctional Services	September 2014	–	1000	Holtze
Fannie Bay Gaol	Museum	Maximum	Department of Community Development, Sport & Cultural Affairs	20 September 1883	1 September 1979	?	Darwin
Gunn Point Prison Farm	Closed	Minimum	Northern Territory Correctional Services	1973	1996	?	Gunn Point
Wildman River Wilderness Work Camp	Closed	Minimum	Northern Territory Correctional Services	1980s	2003	20	Wildman River
Total capacity						2288	(current)

== Queensland ==
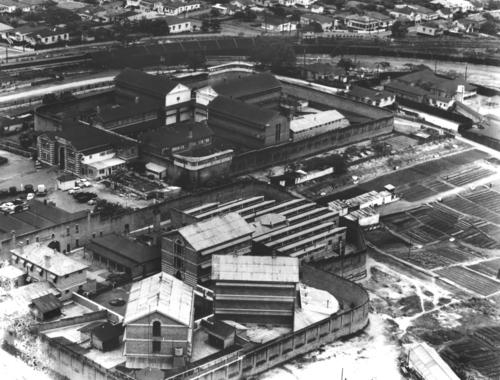
An aerial view of Boggo Road Gaol, Brisbane, circa 1954.

Prisons in Queensland
Prison	Status	Classification	Managed	Opened	Closed	Capacity	Location
Arthur Gorrie Correctional Centre	Operational	Maximum	Queensland Corrective Services	1992	–	890	Wacol, Brisbane
Boggo Road Gaol	Museum+ events venue+	Maximum	Now operating as a museum	July 1883	15 June 1992	?	Dutton Park, Brisbane
Borallon Correctional Centre	Operational	Maximum	Queensland Corrective Services	17 November 1989 & reopened on 7 March 2016	initially closed 25 January 2012	494	Ironbark, City of Ipswich
Brisbane Correctional Centre (formerly known as Sir David Longland Correctional Centre)	Operational	Maximum	Queensland Corrective Services	2008	–	600	Wacol, Brisbane
Brisbane Women's Correctional Centre	Operational	Maximum	Queensland Corrective Services	June 1999	–	270	Wacol, Brisbane
Brisbane Youth Detention Centre	Operational	Maximum	Department of Communities	2001	–	105	Wacol, Brisbane
Cairns Gaol	Closed	Demolished	Prison Department	8 September 1897	7 April 1926	-	Cairns
Capricornia Correctional Centre	Operational	High security/Low security centres	Queensland Corrective Services	12 September 2001	–	500	Etna Creek, north of Rockhampton
Cleveland Youth Detention Centre	Operational	Maximum	Department of Communities	1980	–	100	Townsville
Darling Downs Correctional Centre	Closed	Low/Open	Queensland Corrective Services	10 December 1994	30 September 2012	170	Westbrook
Helena Jones Centre	Operational	Low	Queensland Corrective Services			29	Albion, Brisbane
Ingham Gaol	Closed	Demolished	Prisons Department	1885	6 August 1924	-	Ingham, Shire of Hinchinbrook
John Oxley Youth Detention Centre	Closed	Maximum	Department of Communities	1987	2001	–	Wacol, Brisbane
Lotus Glen Correctional Centre	Operational	Maximum	Queensland Corrective Services	29 May 1989	–	500	Mareeba
Maryborough Correctional Centre	Operational	Maximum	Queensland Corrective Services	14 October 2002	–	500	Maryborough
Numinbah Correctional Centre	Operational	Low/Open	Queensland Corrective Services	28 October 1940	–	129	Numinbah
Palen Creek Correctional Centre	Operational	Low/Open/Protection	Queensland Corrective Services	6 December 1934	–	170	Rathdowney
Rockhampton Correctional Centre (formerly known as Etna Creek Prison)	Closed	High	Queensland Corrective Services	1969	September 2001		Rockhampton
Roma Gaol	Closed	Demolished	Prison Department	7 December 1872	3 October 1903	-	Roma
Sir Leslie Wilson Youth Detention Centre	Closed	Maximum	Department of Communities	1961	2001	–	Windsor
Southern Queensland Correctional Centre	Operational	Minimum to maximum	Queensland Corrective Services	3 March 2012	–	300	Gatton
St. Helena Penal Establishment	Closed	Ruins	N/A	14 May 1867	December 1932	–	St Helena Island, Brisbane
Stone River Prison Farm	Closed	Demolished	Prison Department	December 1945	8 March 1962	-	Ingham
Toowoomba Prison	Closed	Demolished	N/A	1864	1900	–	Toowoomba
Townsville Correctional Centre (formerly known as H.M.P.E. Stewart's Creek)	Operational	Maximum	Queensland Corrective Services	6 April 1893	–	494	Townsville
Whitenbah Prison Farm	Closed	Demolished	Prison Department	21 October 1942	3 May 1949	-	Numinbah
Wolston Correctional Centre	Operational	Maximum	GEO	June 1999	–	600	Wacol
Woodford Correctional Centre	Operational	Maximum	Queensland Corrective Services	28 September 1973	–	1008	Woodford
Total capacity						6166	

== South Australia ==
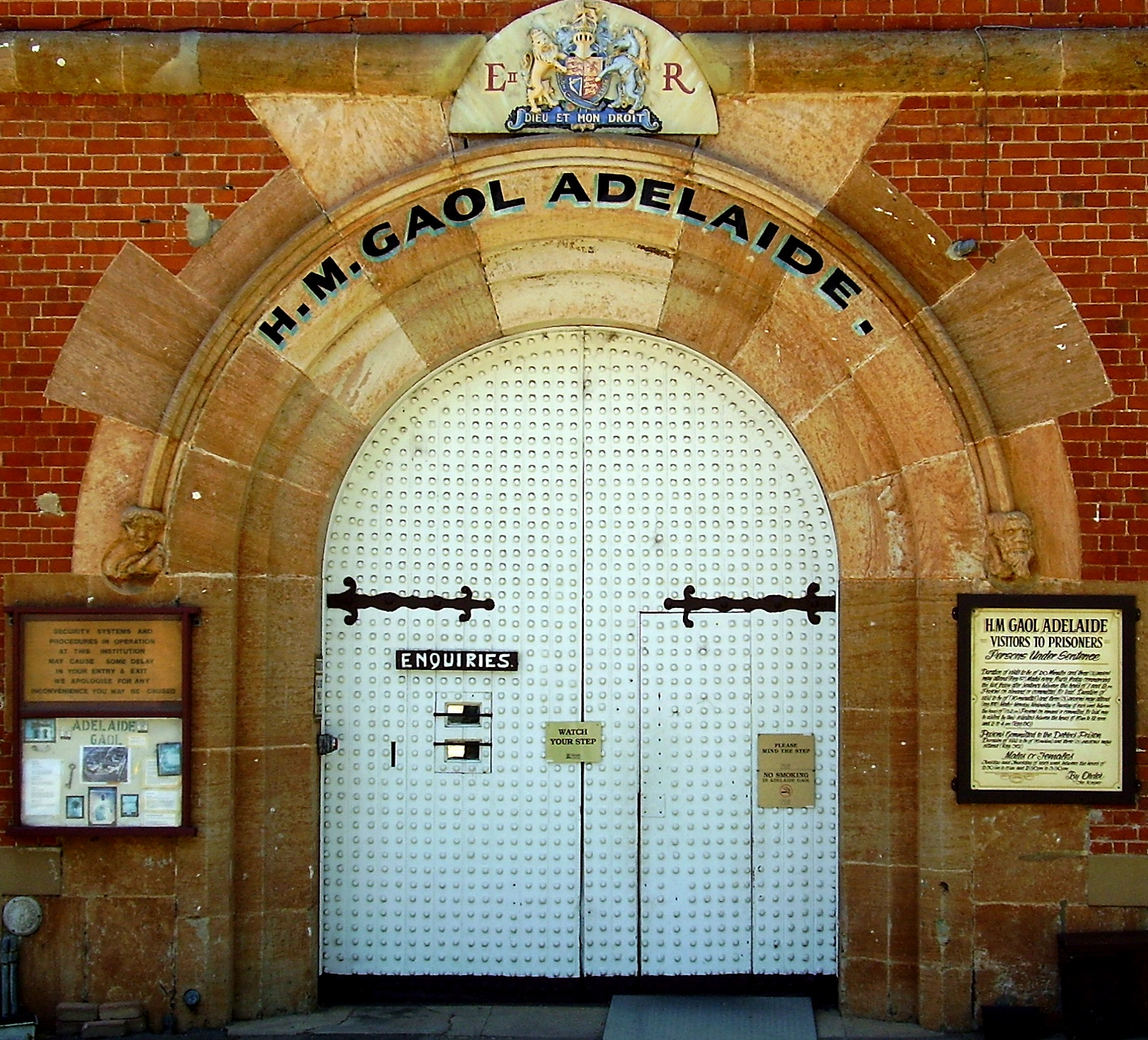
Main Entrance to the former Adelaide Gaol, now a museum.

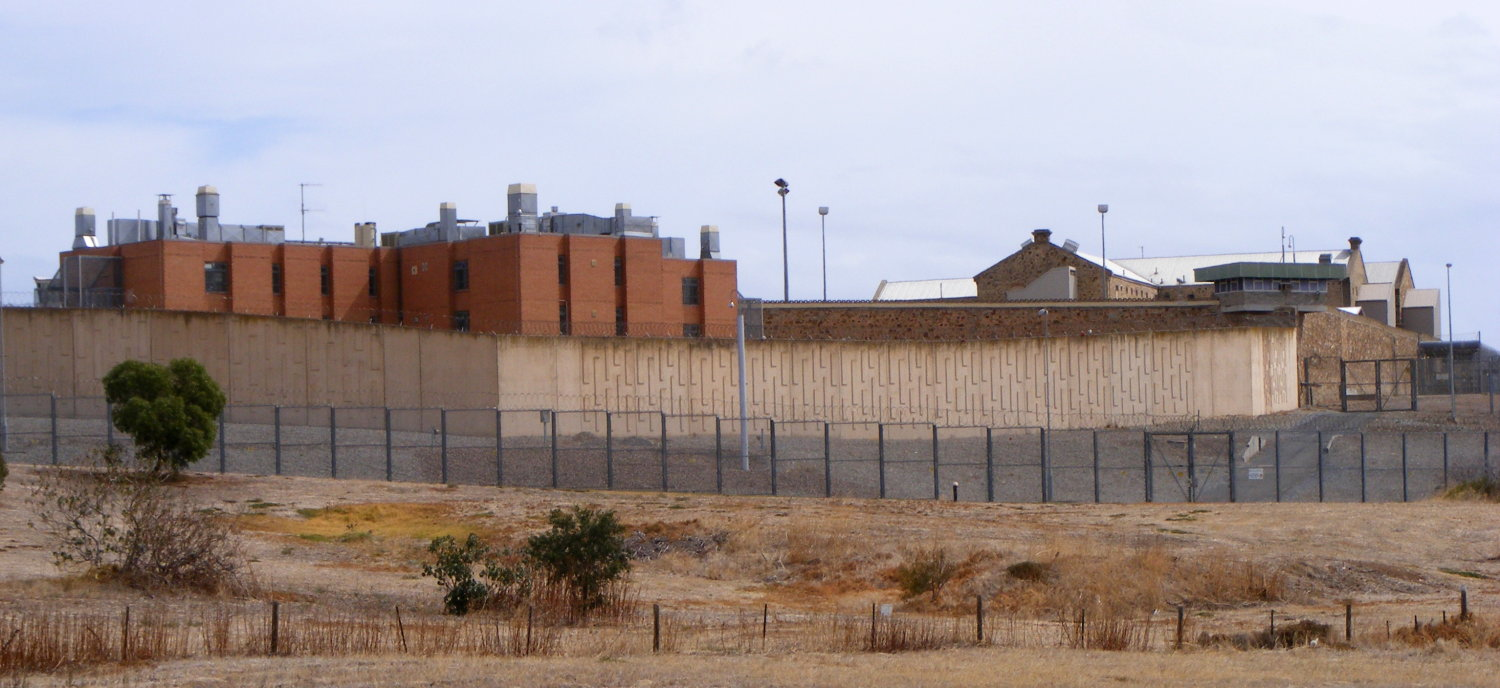
Rear of Yatala Labour Prison, showing walls and watchtower, in 2008.

Prisons in South Australia are managed by the South Australian, Department for Correctional Services apart from the Mount Gambier Prison and Adelaide Remand Centre which are managed by GSL Group.

Prisons in South Australia
Prison	Status	Classification	Managed	Opened	Closed	Capacity	Location
Adelaide Gaol	Museum	Maximum	Department for Correctional Services	1841	1988	[440]	Adelaide
Adelaide Pre-Release Centre	Operational	Minimum	Department for Correctional Services	?	-	104	Adelaide
Adelaide Remand Centre	Operational	Maximum	Corrections and Serco	1986	-	274	Adelaide
Adelaide Women's Prison	Operational	Minimum to maximum	Department for Correctional Services	1969	-	176	Adelaide
Cadell Training Centre	Operational	Minimum	Department for Correctional Services	1960	-	204	Morgan
Gladstone Gaol	Museum	Minimum	Department for Correctional Services	1881	1975	86	Gladstone
Kyeema Prison Camp	Demolished	Minimum	Gaols and Prisons Department	1932	1959		Kyeema
Magill Youth Training Centre	Closed	Minimum	Department for Communities and Social Inclusion	1869	2012		Magill
Mobilong Prison	Operational	Minimum to medium	Department for Correctional Services	1987	-	472	Murray Bridge
Mount Gambier Gaol	Boarding hostel			1866	1995		Mount Gambier
Mount Gambier Prison	Operational	Minimum to maximum	G4S	1995	-	503	Moorak
Port Augusta Prison	Operational	Minimum to maximum	Department for Correctional Services	1869	-	624	Port Augusta
Port Lincoln Prison	Operational	Minimum to medium	Department for Correctional Services	?	-	176	Port Lincoln
Redruth Gaol	Museum			1856	1894		Burra
Robe Gaol	Ruins			1861	?		Robe
Vaughan House (renamed South Australian Youth Remand and Assessment Centre in 1979)	Closed			1947	1993	[72]	Enfield
Wallaroo Gaol	Demolished			1866	1929		Wallaroo
Yatala Labour Prison	Operational	Minimum to maximum; Supermax	Department for Correctional Services	1854	-	578	Adelaide
Total capacity						3,111	(current)

== Tasmania ==
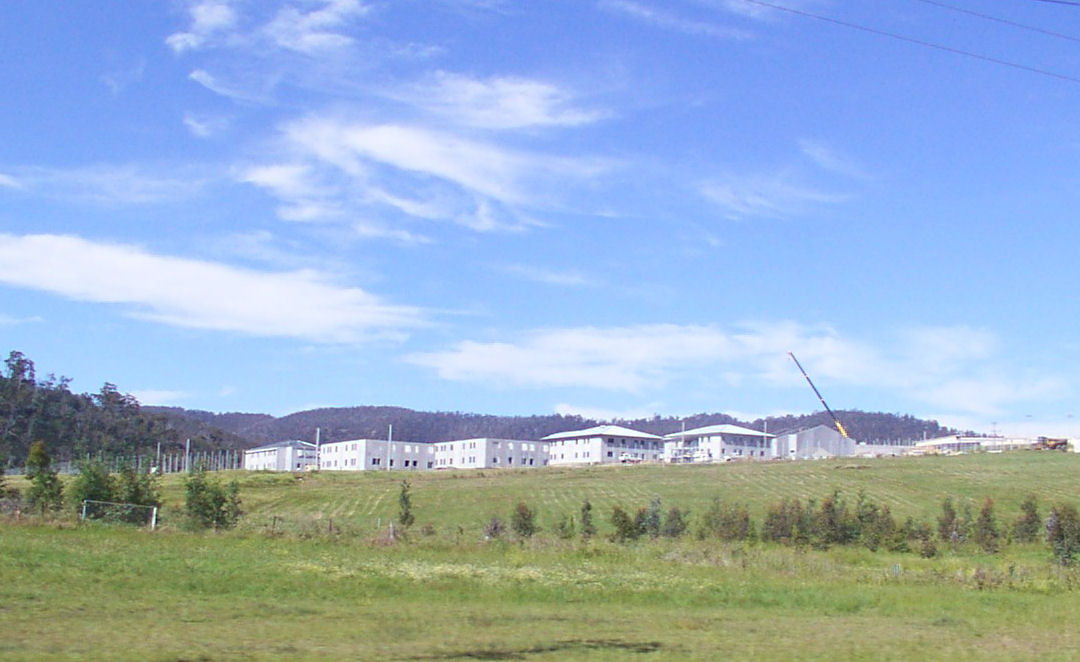
Construction of expanded facilities at HM Prison Risdon, pictured in 2006

Prisons in Tasmania
Prison	Status	Classification	Managed	Opened	Closed	Capacity	Location
Ashley Youth Detention Centre	Operational	Juvenile males and females	Department of Health	1922		51	Deloraine
Campbell Street Gaol	Closed	Museum	As a museum by the National Trust of Australia	1821	1963	[150]	Hobart
Cascades Female Factory	Closed: Ruins	Museum, World Heritage Site	Port Arthur Historic Site Management Authority	1828	1856	?	South Hobart
George Town Female Factory	Demolished	?	?	1822	1834	?	?
HM Hayes Prison Farm	Closed and sold. Not demolished as per latest google earth accessed 1 July 2018.	Minimum (open farm)	Tasmanian Prison Service	1937	2012	70	Hayes
Hobart Town Female Factory	Closed	Demolished	?	1821	1828	?	Hobart
Hobart Reception Centre	Operational	Maximum (males and females)	Tasmanian Prison Service	1999		50	Hobart
Launceston Female Factory	Closed	Demolished	?	November 1834	1855 and was converted to a Gaol till 1914	?	Launceston
Launceston Reception Centre	Operational	Maximum (males and females)	Tasmanian Prison Service	circa 1839		33	Launceston
Macquarie Harbour Penal Station	Closed	Tasmanian Wilderness World Heritage Area	Parks & Wildlife Service (Tasmania)	1822	1833	?	Sarah Island
Maria Island Penal colony (Darlington)	Closed	Ruins		1825	1850	?	Maria Island
Mary Hutchinson Women's Prison	Operational	Minimum to maximum	Tasmanian Prison Service; Department of Health (Wilfred Lopes Centre)	1963		45	Risdon Vale
Port Arthur	Closed	Ruins	Port Arthur Historic Site Management Authority	1830	1877		Port Arthur
Risdon Prison Complex (incorporating the Ron Barwick Minimum Security Prison and the Wilfred Lopes Centre for Forensic Mental Health)	Operational	Medium to maximum/Supermax	Tasmanian Prison Service; Department of Health (Wilfred Lopes Centre)	November 1960 and August 2006		280	Risdon Vale
Ross Female Factory	Museum	Partly ruins		1833	1854	?	Ross
Saltwater River Penal colony	Closed	Ruins		1833	1848	?	Saltwater River
Total capacity						-	(current)

== Victoria ==
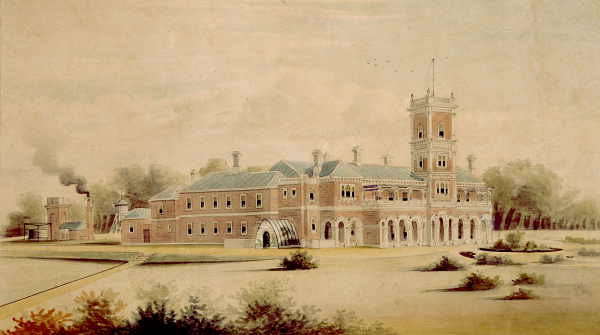
HM Prison Dhurringile, a minimum security centre.

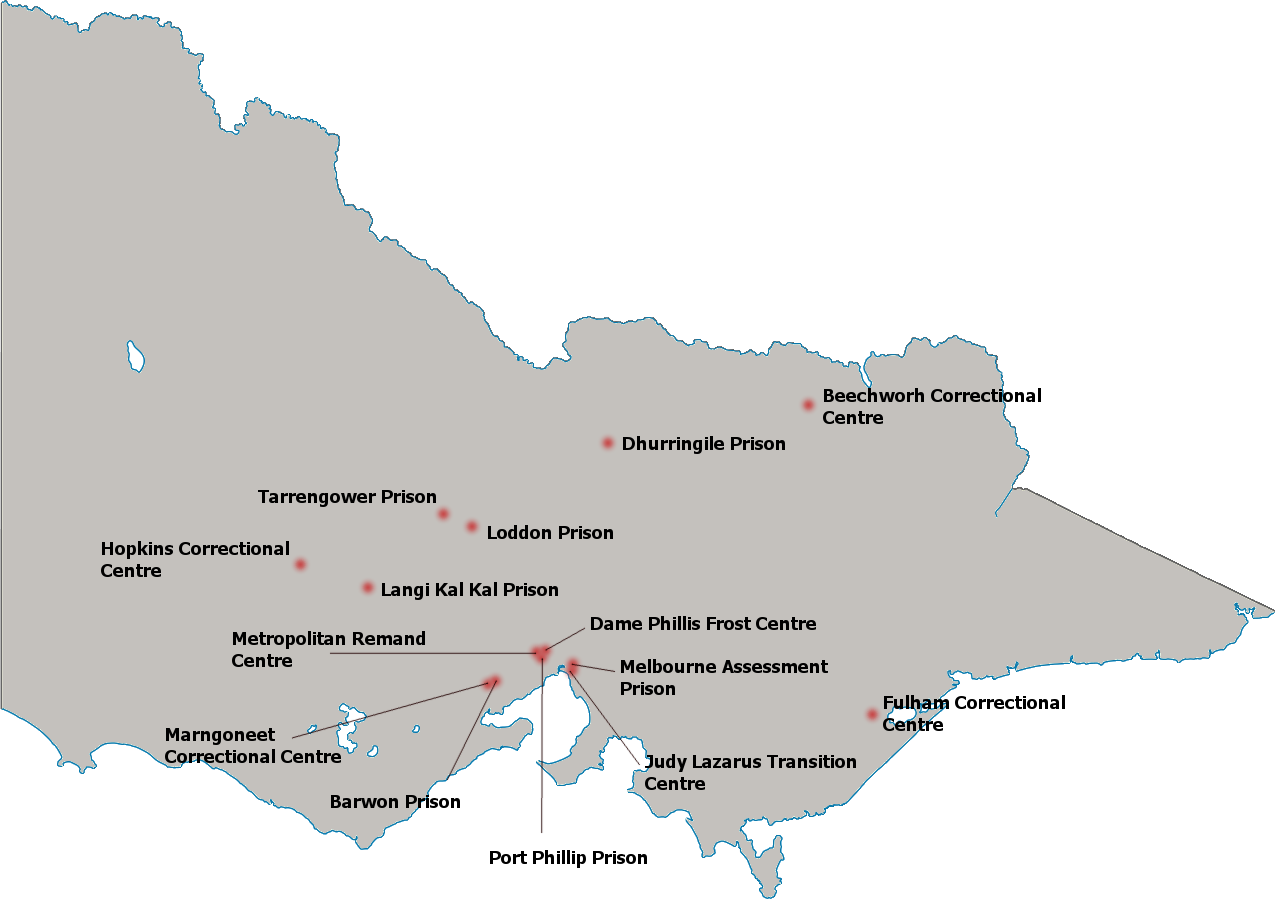
Victoria Prisons map

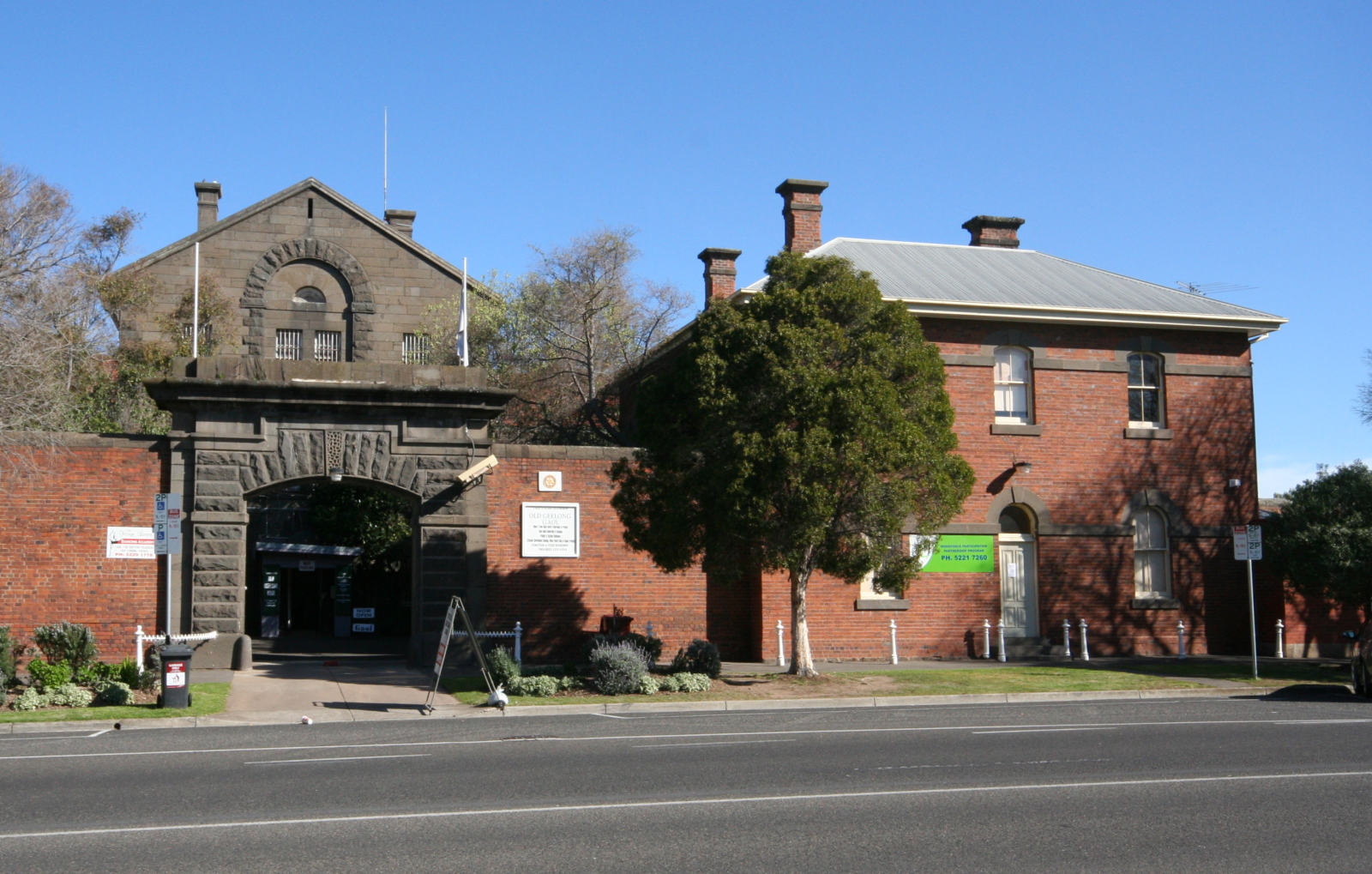
The former HM Prison Geelong, closed in 1991.

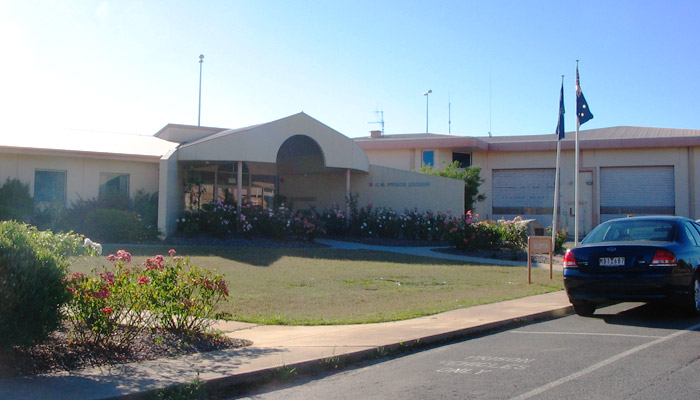
HM Prison Loddon in Castlemaine.

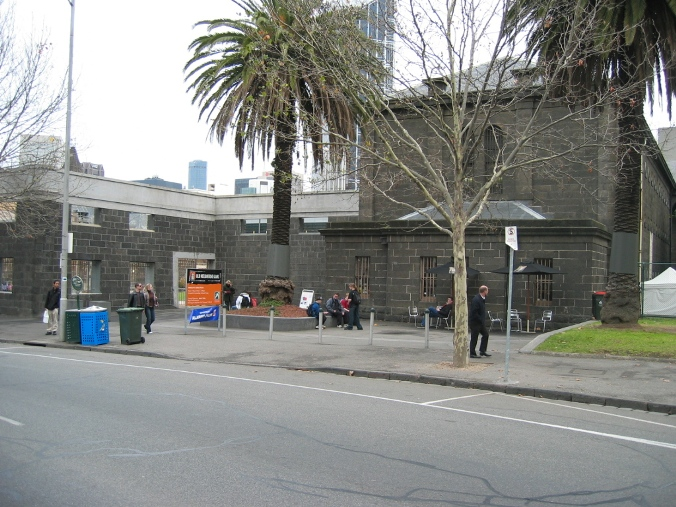
The Old Melbourne Gaol in Russell Street, Melbourne.

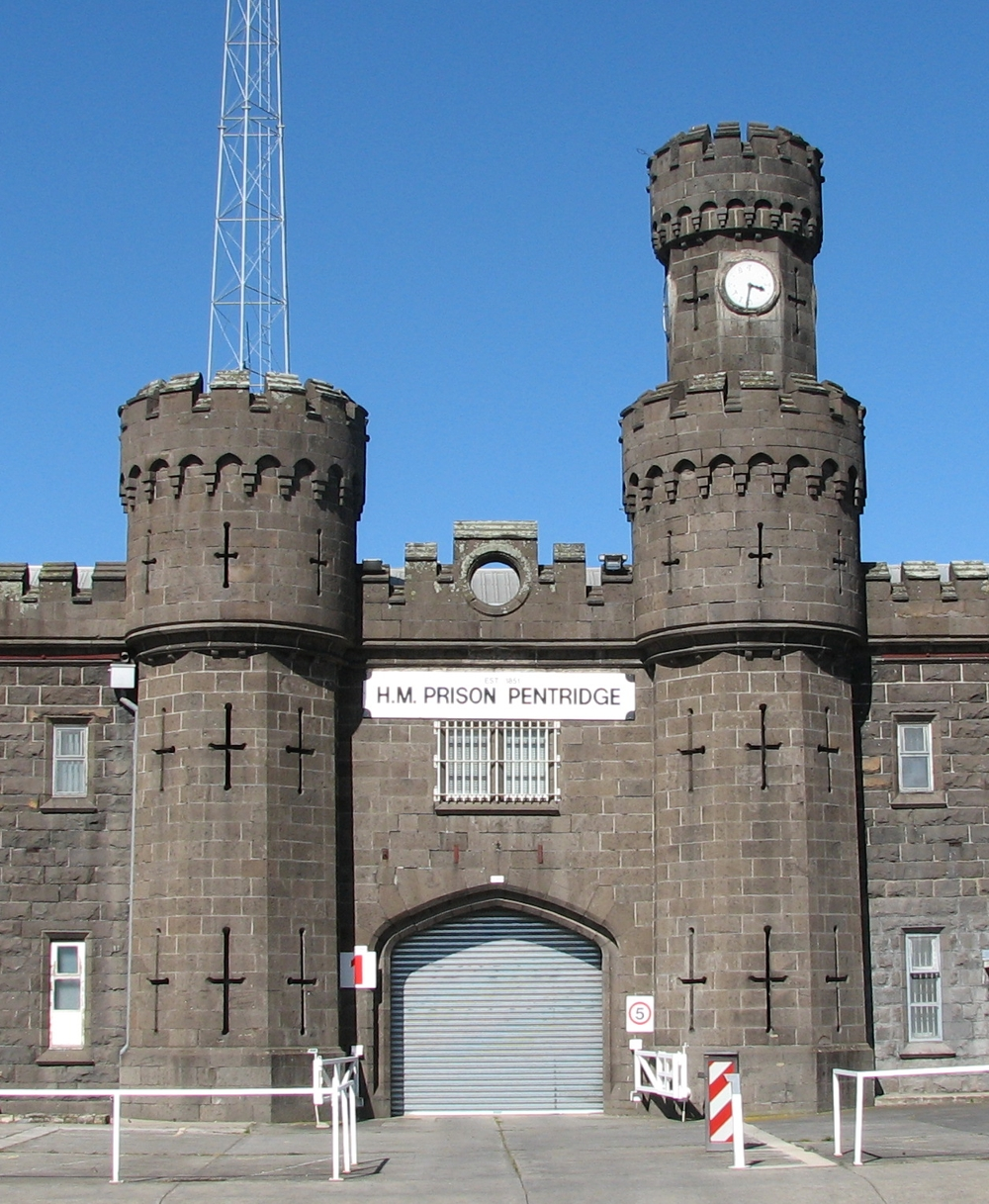
Façade of the former HM Prison Pentridge, located in Coburg.

Adult Prisons and correctional facilities in Victoria are managed by Corrections Victoria. There is a single prison (Fulham) which is privatised and managed by GEO Group Australia Pty. Limited. Youth Justice custodial centres are managed by the Department of Justice and Community Safety.

Victorian Prisons are mostly located in regional Victoria. The prison system is relatively modern with the closure of the last of the "old" gaols in 2005. Bendigo and Won Wron were the last to be closed. Beechworth Prison was closed in 2004 and replaced with the Beechworth Correctional Centre the following year. The large amount of the prisoner population are now held in Ravenhall Correctional Centre, Western Plains Correctional Centre, with other dispersed large facilities across the state.

At 30 June 2015 there were 4,769 sentenced prisoners and 1,413 unsentenced prisoners in Victoria, thus making a total of 6,182 prisoners. From those 6,182 prisoners, 5,762 were males (93%) and 420 were females (7%). Those numbers also include 480 Aboriginal and Torres Strait Islander prisoners, making them 8% of the total number of prisoners in Victoria.

In 2015, the average male prisoner in Victoria was:

- 35.5 years old
- born in Australia
- did not complete high school
- a history of alcohol and drug abuse
- single and unemployed at the time he entered the prison system
- sentence of three years in a medium security prison
- more likely than not to have been imprisoned previously

In 2015, the average female prisoner in Victoria was:

- 36 years old
- born in Australia
- single or in a de facto relationship
- likely to be a mother/primary care giver
- unemployed, home duties or on a pension before prison
- has a higher level of education than her male counterpart but still failed to complete high school
- sentence of less than two years
- likely to be in prison for the first time

At 30 June 2015, the total operational capacity for Victorian prisons was 7,093 and had a utilisation rate of 90.5%.

Prisons in Victoria
Prison	Status	Classification	Managed	Opened	Closed	Capacity	Location
Acheron Boys Home	Closed	Minimum (juveniles)	Youth Justice Custodial Services	circa 1966	2008	[10]	Buxton
Ashendene Boys Home	Closed	Juveniles	Family Welfare Division of the Social Welfare Department	1966	November 1988	?	Olinda
Ballarat Gaol	Closed. Mostly demolished except The main gate, warden's residence, governor's residence and the guard tower	Maximum (males and females)	Corrections Victoria	1862	1965	[74]	Ballarat
HM Prison Barwon (including Barwon Supermax)	Operational	Maximum; supermax	Corrections Victoria	January 1990		478	Lara
Beechworth Correctional Centre	Operational	Minimum	Corrections Victoria	2005		210	Beechworth
Beechworth Gaol	Closed	Museum+mixed use development	Corrections Victoria	1864	2004	[132]	Beechworth
HM Prison Bendigo (Sandhurst Gaol)	Closed	Adaptively reused as Ulumbarra Theatre and partly as Bendigo Senior Secondary College (hospitality school)	Corrections Victoria	1863	2006	[85]	Bendigo
Castlemaine Gaol	Museum	Maximum	State of Victoria	1857	1990	?	Castlemaine
Cherry Creek Youth Justice Centre	Operational	Minimum to maximum	Department of Justice and Community Safety	2023		140	Werribee
Dame Phyllis Frost Centre	Operational	Minimum to maximum (female)	Corrections Victoria	15 August 1996		604	Deer Park
HM Prison Dhurringile	Closed	Minimum	Corrections Victoria	1965	2024	328	Murchison
HM Prison Fairlea	Closed. Demolished	Maximum	?	1956	1996	?	Fairfield
Fulham Correctional Centre (including NALU)	Operational	Minimum to Medium	GEO Group Australia	1997		893	Sale
HM Prison Geelong	Museum	Maximum	Corrections Victoria	1853	1991	?	Geelong
Hopkins Correctional Centre	Operational	Medium Protection	Corrections Victoria	1967		762	Ararat
J Ward (HM Prison Ararat)	Museum	Maximum	Corrections Victoria	1859	1991	?	Ararat
Judy Lazarus Transition Centre	Operational	Minimum	Corrections Victoria	2007		25	West Melbourne
HM Prison Langi Kal Kal	Operational. Between 1965 and 1993 used as a youth training centre.	Minimum	Corrections Victoria	1951, 1993	1965 (reopened)	428	Beaufort
HM Prison Loddon	Operational	Medium	Corrections Victoria	1990		468	Castlemaine
Malmsbury Youth Justice Centre	Closed. Set to reopen in mid 2026.	Minimum to maximum	Department of Justice and Community Safety	1965	2024	[74]	Malmsbury
Marngoneet Correctional Centre	Operational	Medium	Corrections Victoria	2006		559	Lara
McLeod Prison Farm	Reused as a bed and breakfast motel, then a farm.			1916	1975		French Island
Melbourne Assessment Prison	Operational	Maximum	Corrections Victoria	6 April 1989		305	West Melbourne
Old Melbourne Gaol	Museum & Events venue	Maximum	State of Victoria	1845	1924	?	Melbourne
Melbourne Youth Justice Centre	Operational	Medium to maximum	Department of Justice and Community Safety	1993		110	Parkville
Metropolitan Remand Centre	Operational	Maximum remand	Corrections Victoria	2006		954	Ravenhall
HM Prison Morwell River	Closed	Minimum	Corrections Victoria	1951	1997	?	Morwell
HM Prison Pentridge	Closed	Maximum	Museum and Housing Estate built on site	1851	1997	?	Coburg
Parkville Youth Residential Centre	Operational	Medium to maximum	Department of Justice and Community Safety	1993		30	Parkville
Port Phillip Prison (St John's Subacute Unit)	Mostly Closed. Only 20 specialist medical beds remain operational.	Minimum to maximum	G4S Australia	1997	2025	[1117] 20	Truganina
HM Prison Sale	Only façade survived. Land developed into police station.	Medium	Corrections Victoria	1887	1997	?	Sale
Tarrengower Prison	Operational	Minimum (female)	Corrections Victoria	1988		78	Maldon
Ravenhall Correctional Centre	Operational	Medium	GEO Group Australia	2017		1300	Ravenhall
Turana Youth Training Centre	Closed	Medium to maximum	Department of Health and Community Services	1955	1993	[86]	Parkville
Western Plains Correctional Centre	Operational	Maximum	Corrections Victoria	2025		1292	Lara
HM Prison Won Wron	Reused as Wulgunggo Ngalu Learning Place	Minimum	Corrections Victoria	1964	2004	[127]	Won Wron
Total capacity						7093 updated to 7800	(current)

== Western Australia ==
Prisons and correctional facilities in Western Australia are managed by the Department of Justice through public and private operators.

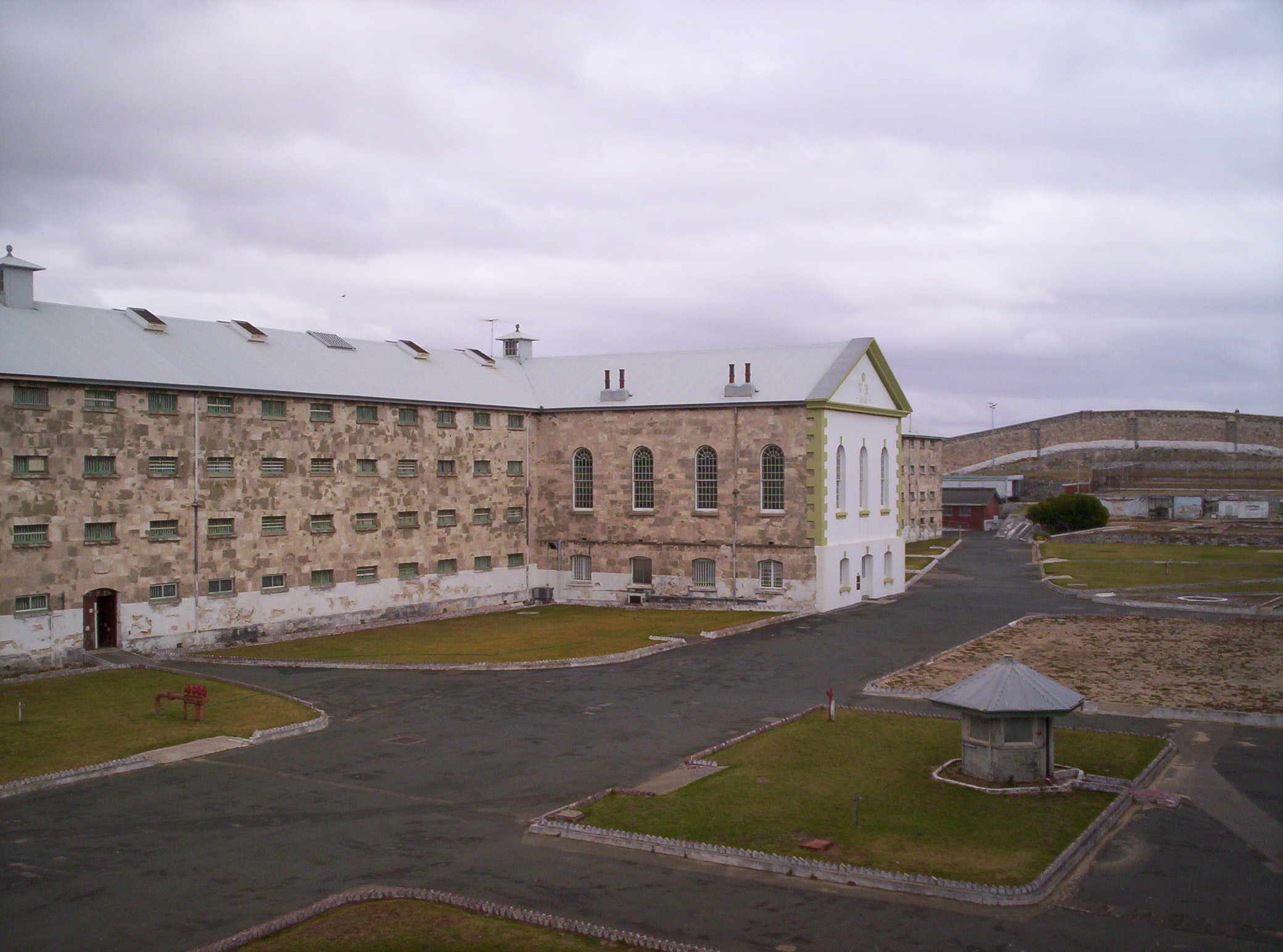
The main cell block of Fremantle Prison.

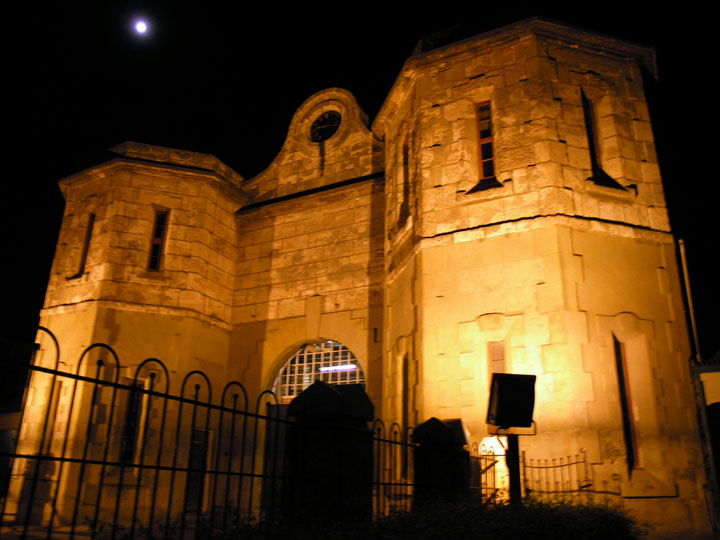
The gatehouse of Fremantle Prison by moonlight.

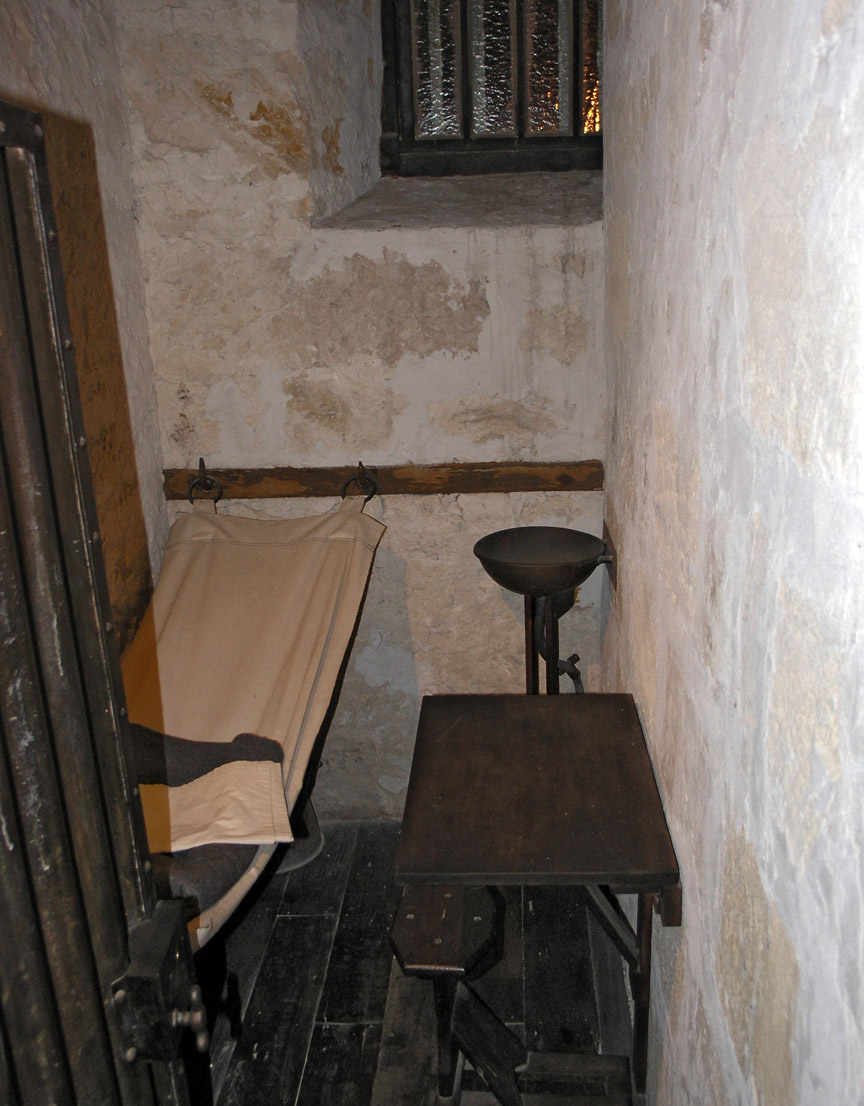
A typical cell in Fremantle Prison.

Prisons in Western Australia
Prison	Status	Classification	Managed	Opened	Closed	Capacity	Location
Acacia Prison	Operational	Medium	Serco	May 2001		1,525	Wooroloo
Albany Regional Prison	Operational	Maximum	Department of Justice	16 September 1966		310	Albany
Bandyup Women's Prison	Operational	Mixed (female)	Department of Justice	January 1970		259	West Swan
Banksia Hill Juvenile Detention Centre	Operational	Medium to maximum	Department of Justice	September 1997		?	Canning Vale
Boronia Pre-release Centre for Women	Operational	Minimum (female)	Department of Justice	May 2004		82	Bentley
Broome Regional Prison	Operational	Minimum to maximum (male/female)	Department of Justice	February 1945		138	Broome
Bunbury Regional Prison	Operational	Maximum (remand only); Minimum to medium	Department of Justice	February 1971		340	College Grove
Casuarina Prison	Operational	Minimum to maximum	Department of Justice	June 1991		1,200	Casuarina
Eastern Goldfields Regional Prison	Operational	Minimum to maximum (male/female)	Department of Justice	2016		136	Boulder
Fremantle Prison	World Heritage Site	Maximum	Department of Corrective Services	1855	8 November 1991	800	Fremantle
Greenough Regional Prison	Operational	Maximum (remand only); Minimum to medium	Department of Justice	October 1984		323	Narngulu
Hakea Prison	Operational	Minimum to maximum	Department of Justice	June 1982		897	Canning Vale
Karnet Prison Farm	Operational	Minimum	Department of Justice	March 1963		326	Serpentine
Melaleuca Remand and Reintegration Facility	Operational	Maximum	Department of Justice	2016		254	Canning Vale
Nyandi Women's Prison	Closed	Minimum	Department of Justice	1970	2004		Bentley
Pardelup Prison Farm	Operational	Minimum	Department of Justice	1927		96	Mount Barker
Perth Gaol	Closed	Minimum		1854	1888		Northbridge
Rangeview Juvenile Remand Centre	Closed	Remand Centre	Department of Corrective Services	1994	2012	92	Murdoch
Riverbank Prison	Closed		Department of Justice	1970	2001		Caversham
Roebourne Regional Prison	Operational	Minimum to maximum (male/female)	Department of Justice	March 1984		161	Roebourne
Round House	Closed	Museum	Fremantle City Council	1830	1886		Fremantle
Wandoo Reintegration Facility	Operational	Minimum	Department of Justice	November 2012		80	Murdoch
West Kimberley Regional Prison	Operational	Minimum to medium	Department of Justice	1 November 2012		150	Derby
Wooroloo Prison Farm	Operational	Minimum	Department of Justice	1972		360	Wooroloo
Total capacity						?	(current)

== See also ==
- List of prisons
- List of Australian immigration detention facilities
- List of Australian psychiatric institutions
- List of Australian penal colonies
- List of Australians in international prisons
- Punishment in Australia
- Capital punishment in Australia
