= Moreton Correctional Centre =

Former prison in Queensland, Australia

Coordinates: 27°34′25.2″S 152°55′17.7″E

- Interactive map of Moreton Correctional Centre
- Location: 260 Wacol Station Road, Wacol, Queensland
- Status: Closed
- Opened: 1957
- Closed: 2004
- Former name: Security Patients' Hospital (1971–1990)
- Managed by: Queensland Corrective Services

Moreton Correctional Centre was a prison located at 260 Wacol Station Road, Wacol, Brisbane, Queensland, Australia. It was formerly known as the Security Patients' Hospital (1972–1985).

This facility formed a complex of corrective facilities in the area, adjoining land with the Sir David Longland Correctional Centre (now Brisbane Correctional Centre), the former John Oxley Youth Detention Centre to the south (replaced by the nearby Brisbane Youth Detention Centre), and the now-former Wolston Park Hospital Complex (with its 1989 John Oxley Memorial Hospital, a special purpose secure psychiatric facility, which included housing patients who had been found criminally insane).

== History ==
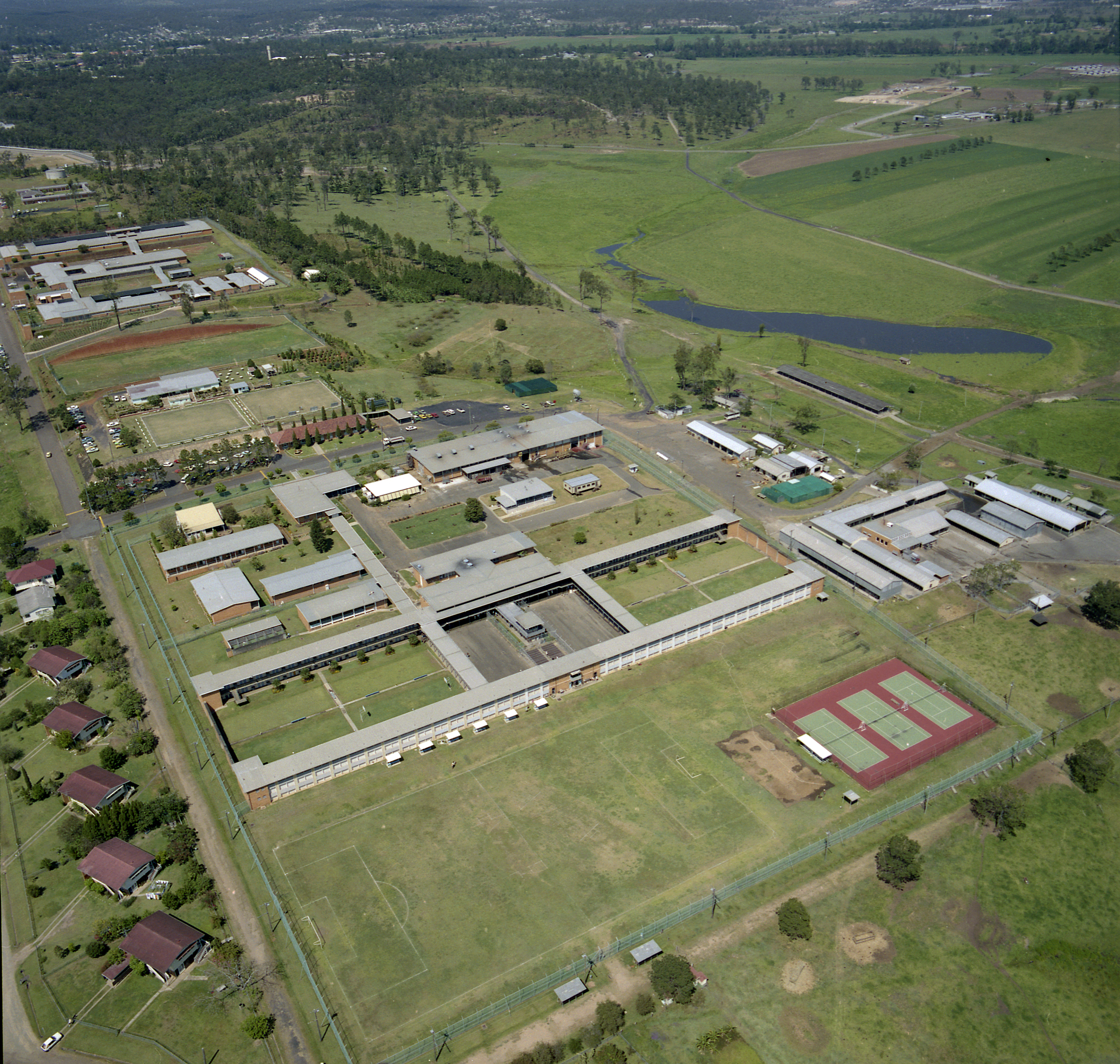
1988 aerial view of the then-Wacol prison with Moreton Correctional Centre to upper left (south). (Further to the upper left is the outer fence and road of the then-Sir David Longland prison.)

The land had prior use as the headquarters of the World War II military encampment, "Camp Columbia", first by US troops, and then the Netherlands East Indies government-in-exile.

The Camp Columbia HQ area started in 1957 with HM Prison Wacol, and a section called the Wacol Security Patients' Hospital. In 1971, it was renamed as the Moreton Security Patients Hospital, whilst the prison proper became the Wacol Correctional Centre (but also as "Moreton A").

In 1990, the hospital changed its name to Moreton Correctional Centre (also known as "Moreton B"), but remained as a prisoner medical institution. In 1996, both "Moreton A" and "Moreton B" were called the Moreton Correctional Centre, but separate to the later Wolston Correctional Centre which was built 2.5 kilometres (1.6 mi) away. There was also a "Moreton C", a section housed protected prisoners such as former politicians, former police officers, and paedophiles.

In July 1991, eight prisoners escaped the prison, resulting in statewide and interstate police searches, and four senior prison officers having their employment terminated.

By 1992 the facility was described as "a special purpose facility for medical segregation, protection and a program based intervention unit for prisoners", and housed up to 145 inmates of all security classifications. Inmates could participate in the woodturning and rag cutting industries, and the prison under the control of a general manager. That year also saw the commencement of a pilot sex offenders treatment programme. As a result of the 1991 escape, Sir David Longland prison returned to being a high security centre, and Moreton Correctional Centre returning as a special purpose placement centre.

In 1989/90, the prison held 62 inmates; 1990/1, 74; and 1991/2, 143; in 1992, all male, and only two identifying as First Nations. There were a total of 13 inmates escaping in those three years. Administration costs were calculated at $1371 per inmate per year.

== Site use today ==
After 1996, the correctional facilities were described as "dilapidated".

Part of the site is used as the Queensland Corrective Services Academy for training new corrective service officers.

== Notable prisoners ==
- Terry Lewis (1928–2023), former police commissioner.

== See also ==
- List of Australian prisons
