= Brisbane Correctional Centre =

Prison facility in Queensland, Australia

Coordinates: 27°34′56.88″S 152°55′14.53″E

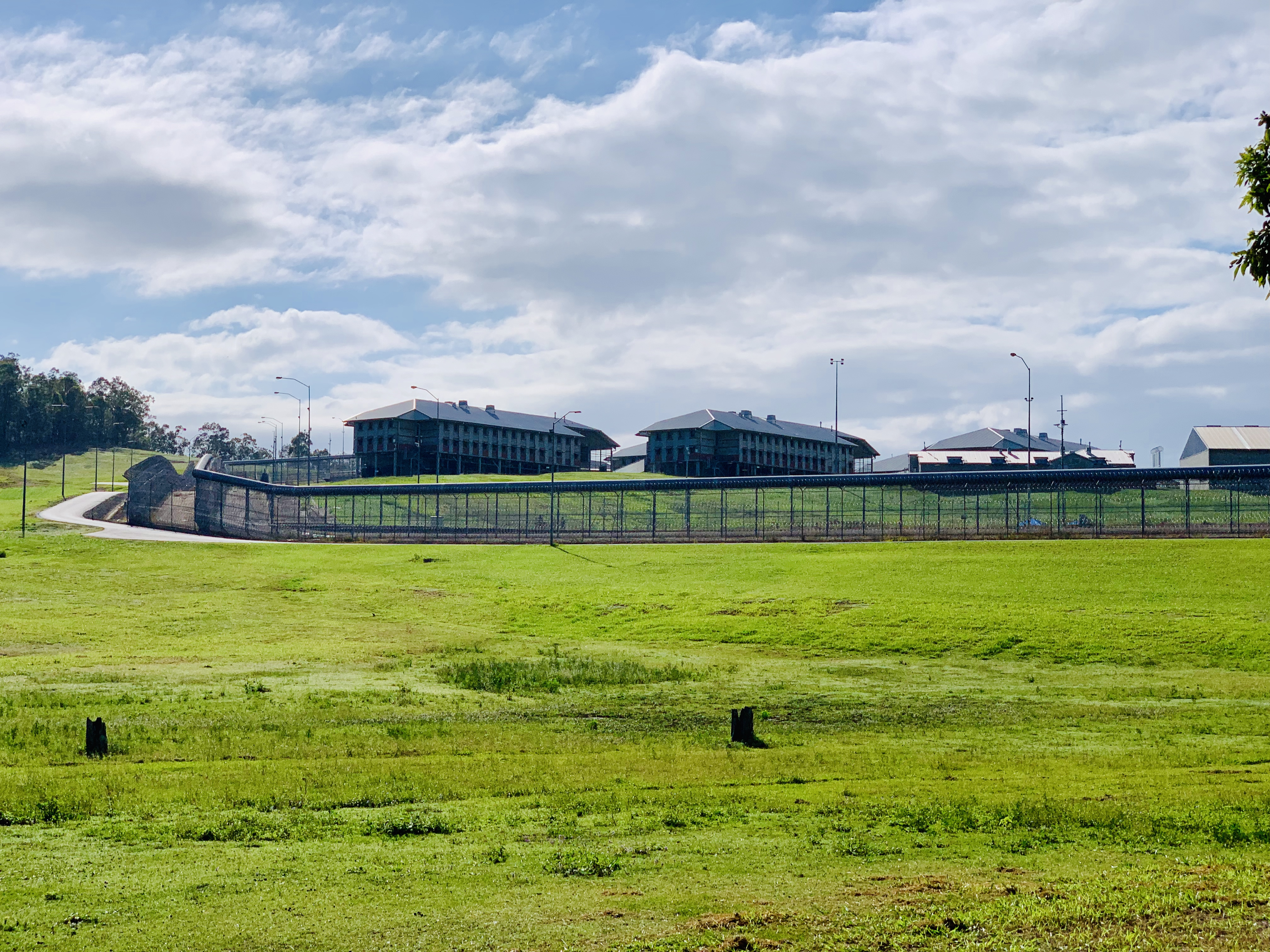
- Brisbane Correctional Centre, 2019
- Interactive map of Brisbane Correctional Centre
- Location: Wacol, Queensland
- Status: Operational
- Security class: High-to-maximum security
- Capacity: 558
- Opened: 1988
- Former name: Sir David Longland Correctional Centre; HM Brisbane Industrial Prison
- Managed by: Queensland Corrective Services

Brisbane Correctional Centre, formerly the Sir David Longland Correctional Centre, formerly HM Brisbane Industrial Prison, and also known as Wacol Prison, is a male prison facility located in the suburb of Wacol in Brisbane, Queensland, Australia.

This prison also took over housing inmates from the 1992 closure of the Boggo Road Gaol.

This facility forms a complex of corrective facilities in the area, with the former John Oxley Youth Detention Centre across the road to the south-east (replaced by the nearby Brisbane Youth Detention Centre to the south-west), the now-closed Security Patients Hospital/Moreton Correctional Centre to the north, and the newer Wolston Correctional Centre to the west.

== History ==
Opened in 1988, it was named for Sir David Longland (1909–1988), Queensland's Under Secretary of the Department of Works in 1957, and the State's first ombudsman. Longland also undertook a review after the 1983 Boggo Road Gaol riots, which was about inadequate food and harsh treatment perceptions. Starting with 240 prisoners in 12- and 24-cell blocks, it became a 328-bed secure facility for males. In 1996, another 96 beds were added, and in 2001, an 18-bed maximum security unit. There was also a detention unit for six inmates, and an isolation cell for two inmates. Prisoners were able to engage in laundry, carpentry, and bakery.

An inmate died in January 1990 where a former prison officer suggested there was a cover-up, but this suggestion was not supported by an investigation by the Criminal Justice Commission. In March 1993 the violent death of an armed robber/attempted murder inmate led to the "Angry Gang" going on to control drugs and extortion within the prison. Another violent death occurred in September 1994. A former inmate was charged in October 2014 with the deaths of inmates in February 1995 and March 1998.

In 1997, one break-out included the "Postcard Bandit" Brenden Abbott. A twice-murderer inmate was killed in October 2003 by another sentenced murderer.

It was closed for two-and-a-half-years from 2006 for a $110 million refurbishment, to allow for expansion given an increase of 86.6% in prison population over a decade from 1995. Current prisoners were moved to primarily to Woodford and Maryborough facilities. Cell Block B was to be demolished, six 50-cell wings constructed, and blocks 2C, 3C, 4C, and 5C combined to provide 48-cells per block. In June 2008, the prison complex was renovated and subsequently re-opened to inmates.

A 2008 complex hosted a unit specifically designed for 17-year-old prisoners, which was later closed in 2019 due to amended laws.

== Facilities ==
The new 2008 refurbishment saw the former Sir David Longland Prison change to become dedicated reception and assessment prison (as different to Arthur Gorrie Remand and Reception Centre/Correctional Centre, which was for non-sentenced persons).

The correctional centre featured a new water conservation system, new electronic security technology, and improved design principles. There was also a new maximum security wing for prisoners considered dangerous.

The facility currently consists of 16 units, including a protection unit mainly for elderly prisoners and prisoners with sexual charges, as well as a medical unit for prisoners with serious psychological problems and suicidal thoughts. A typical unit has approximately 70 prisoners.

== Notable prisoners ==
- Brenden Abbott (born 1962), "Postcard Bandit" escapee.
- Geoffrey Robert Dobbs, labelled Australia's worst paedophile, pleaded guilty to 124 sex offences and one count of attempting to pervert the course of justice on counts against 63 girls under his care as a teacher and youth leader from 1972 to 2000.

== See also ==
- List of Australian prisons
