= Corrections Victoria =

Victorian government department overseeing prisons

Agency overview
- Formed: 1 July 2003
- Type: Part of Corrections and Justice Services
- Jurisdiction: Victoria, Australia
- Minister responsible: Hon. Enver Erdogan MP, Minister for Corrections
- Agency executives: Emma Catford, Deputy Secretary; Larissa Strong, Commissioner
- Parent agency: Department of Justice and Community Safety

Corrections Victoria is part of the Department of Justice and Community Safety in the Victorian Government. It is responsible for the provision of custodial and community-based services as an important element of the criminal justice system in the state of Victoria, Australia.

The services provided include correctional centre custody of remand and sentenced inmates, parole, pre-sentence reports and advice to courts and releasing authorities, community service orders, and other forms of community-based offender supervision. Offenders in custody and those supervised in the community are assessed for relevant interventions to reduce their risks of re-offending. Corrections Victoria works in partnership with other government and non-government justice and human services agencies in regard to inmates in custody and offenders in the community.

== History ==
The Office of Corrections (OOC) was established in August 1983 as a separate government department responsible for the management of adults corrections reporting to the Minister of Corrections. In October 1992, the Kennett government commenced a major prison reform program involving the private sector financing, designing, building and managing new prisons. The OOC was abolished and reconstituted as the Correctional Services Division within the new Department of Justice. In 1994, the government privatised prisoner transport, security and escorts to the higher courts. In 1995, the Office of the Correctional Services Commissioner (OCSC) was established within the Department of Justice, and in 1996, the CORE - the Public Correctional Enterprise was separately established also within the Department of Justice. The OCSC was responsible for monitoring the performance of all correctional services. CORE was responsible for managing the public prisons, Community Correctional Services and the Security and Emergency Services Group (SESG). In August 1996, the first private prison opened the Dame Phyllis Frost Centre followed by the Fulham Correctional Centre and the Port Phillip Prison in 1997. On 1 July 2003, the OCSC and CORE were amalgamated into a single entity Corrections Victoria to oversee corrections.

== Prison management in Victoria ==
Corrections Victoria oversees the management of Victoria's 12 public prisons in the Department's Regions.

- Barwon Prison
- Beechworth Correctional Centre
- Dame Phyllis Frost Centre (for women)
- Hopkins Correctional Centre (Ararat)
- Langi Kal Kal Prison
- Loddon Prison
- Marngoneet Correctional Centre
- Melbourne Assessment Prison
- Metropolitan Remand Centre
- Tarrengower Prison (for women)
- Western Plains Correctional Centre
- Port Phillip Correctional Centre (St John's Subacute Unit)

The Regions also run the Community Correctional Service on behalf of Corrections Victoria using around 50 different reporting centres.

=== Private prisons ===
- Fulham Correctional Centre, managed by GEO
- Ravenhall Correctional Centre, managed by GEO

== See also ==
- Community service
- List of Australian prisons
