= Wolston Correctional Centre =

Prison in Queensland, Australia

- Location in Queensland
- Location: Wacol, Queensland; 27.5859°S 152.9038°E
- Status: Operational
- Security class: High
- Capacity: 900
- Opened: 1999
- Former name: Wacol Correctional Centre
- Managed by: Queensland Corrective Services

Wolston Correctional Centre is an Australian high-security prison facility in Wacol, Brisbane, Queensland, Australia. Wolston holds high-profile prisoners. It was formerly known as Wacol Correctional Centre.

It is near the Brisbane Correctional Centre (formerly the Sir David Longland Correctional Centre), Brisbane Women's Correctional Centre, and the Brisbane Youth Detention Centre (formerly the John Oxley Youth Detention Centre).

== History ==
In 2018, Wolston Correctional Centre was severely overcrowded, with some cells designed for a single prisoner accommodating two or more prisoners. This is often achieved by requiring one or more of the prisoners to sleep on the floor. Such overcrowding has led to a dramatic increase in violent assaults as such cramped living conditions increases psychological stress and discomfort of inmates. It is also often the prison guards who become the victims of such assaults.

== Notable prisoners ==
- Gerard Baden-Clay, sentenced to life imprisonment for 2012 murder of his wife.
- Brett Peter Cowan (born 1969), serial paedophile, sentenced to life imprisonment for 2003 murder of school boy.
- Leonard Fraser (1951–2007), serial killer, sentenced to life imprisonment for 1999 murder of girl.
- Robert Paul Long, sentenced to life imprisonment for 2000 arson which killed 15 backpackers.
- Paul Pisasale, former Lord Mayor of Ipswich convicted in 2019 of extortion
- Massimo "Max" Sica, sentenced to life imprisonment for the 2003 triple murder of his former girlfriend and her two siblings.
- Rick Thorburn, sentenced to life imprisonment with non-parole of 20 years for 2015 murder of his foster daughter.

== See also ==
- List of Australian prisons
