= Palen Creek Correctional Centre =

Prison in Queensland, Australia

Coordinates: 28°19′33.5″S 152°46′10.6″E

- Interactive map of Palen Creek Correctional Centre
- Location: Rathdowney, Queensland
- Status: Operational
- Security class: Minimum – low and open
- Capacity: 170
- Opened: 1934
- Managed by: Queensland Corrective Services

Palen Creek Correctional Centre is situated about 100 km south west of Brisbane in the rural community of Rathdowney. HM Prison Palen Creek was established in 1934. This was the first prison in the Commonwealth to have absolutely no security measures except the honour of prisoners selected to go there. Prisoners erected their own buildings (they lived in tents originally) and sold produce from prisoner maintained market gardens. In 1937, there was a daily average of 50 male prisoners at Palen Creek.

Palen Creek now accommodates 170 prisoners. The centre is designed for low and open security male inmates. The operational focus of these activities places an emphasis upon the need to ensure that inmates address their offending behaviour. This is facilitated by programs including vocational training, industry based employment and general education aimed at increasing skill levels of literacy and numeracy.

Staffing of the centre reflects a multi-disciplinary team-based approach to operational requirements, with the management structure founded upon functional area responsibilities and team management principles. The centre is now managed and linked to Wolston Correctional Centre in Brisbane.

The industries operating at Palen Creek are cattle, chillies, and farm produce including vegetables, fruit and eggs which supply the centre's kitchens. There is now also a rag industry workshop, where old clothes are prepared and recycled for industrial use.

== See also ==
- List of Australian Prisons
