= HM Prison Langi Kal Kal =

Prison in Victoria, Australia

Coordinates: 37°24′22″S 143°29′22″E

- Interactive map of HM Prison Langi Kal Kal
- Location: Trawalla, Victoria
- Status: Operational
- Security class: Minimum security
- Capacity: 428
- Opened: 1951,1993
- Closed: 1965 (later reopened)
- Managed by: Corrections Victoria

HM Prison Langi Kal Kal is an Australian prison located in Trawalla, near Beaufort, Victoria, Australia. The prison is a minimum security prison farm and all inmates are required to work if they are physical able and under 65. It is a minimum security pathway for protection prisoners from Hopkins Correctional Centre.

== History ==
Langi Kal Kal Prison is 140 kilometres west of Melbourne on the Western Highway at Trawalla. The land it is built on was originally a 70,000-acre (280 km^{2}) farming property in 1838, on which a substantial farmhouse was built around 1900. After World War Two the land was subdivided and the central area, which included the farmhouse, was turned into the prison. The current prison is built on 2,695-acre (10.91 km^{2}).

Prisoners first arrived in September 1950, and the prison was officially opened in February 1951. In 1965, the prison was transferred to the Youth Welfare Division, but again became an adult prison in June 1993.

The prison's name is derived from an Indigenous phrase meaning "resting place of the singing cicada".
