= John Oxley Youth Detention Centre =

Youth detention centre in Queensland, Australia

The John Oxley Youth Detention Centre was a youth detention center at Wacol in Ipswich, Queensland, Australia. It operated from 1987 to 2001. The Brisbane Youth Detention Centre was built to replace the closed Cleveland Youth Detention Centre.

The centre was central to the Carmody Inquiry into child protection. The inquiry examined the Heiner Affair, which was an inquiry into the management of the John Oxley Youth Detention Centre in the late 1980s. The inquiry heard allegations that children at the centre were left outside in their winter in their underwear and also handcuffed to a pool fence. Management was accused of bullying and intimidation.

== See also ==
- Punishment in Australia
