= Darling Downs Correctional Centre =

Prison in Queensland, Australia 1994–2012

Coordinates: 27°37′00.66″S 151°49′50.30″E

- Interactive map of Darling Downs Correctional Centre
- Location: Toowoomba, Queensland
- Status: Closed
- Security class: Minimum
- Capacity: 140
- Opened: 1994
- Closed: 2012
- Managed by: Queensland Corrective Services

Darling Downs Correctional Centre was a low-security prison facility in Toowoomba, Queensland, Australia. The prison had a capacity of 140 as well as 40 work camp prisoners. It provided employment to 40 full-time staff.

The prison closed in 2012 as part of a cost cutting measure.

== See also ==
- List of Australian prisons
