= GEO Group Australia =

Australian company

The GEO Group Australia Pty. Ltd.
- Company type: Subsidiary
- Industry: Corrections
- Founded: 1991; 35 years ago (as Australasian Correctional Management Pty. Ltd. (ACM))
- Headquarters: City of Sydney, New South Wales, Australia
- Area served: Australia
- Key people: Pieter Bezuidenhout (M.D.)
- Number of employees: 1,400+ (2019)
- Parent: The GEO Group, Inc.
- Website: www.geogroup.com.au

The GEO Group Australia Pty. Ltd. is an Australian subsidiary of American company The GEO Group Inc., responsible for the delivery of outsourced and privatised correctional services in Australia. Its head office is on Level 18 in the National Mutual Centre in the Sydney CBD in the City of Sydney, Sydney, New South Wales.

The company was founded in 1991 as Australasian Correctional Management Pty, Ltd.

== Facilities ==
Prisons managed by GEO Group Australia include;

- Junee Correctional Centre, under contract with Corrective Services NSW
- Arthur Gorrie Correctional Centre, under contract with Queensland Corrective Services
- Parklea Correctional Centre (until April 1, 2019), under contract with Corrective Services NSW
- Fulham Correctional Centre, with the separate 60-inmate capacity juvenile detention facility Nalu at Fulham Correctional Centre, both under contract with Corrections Victoria
- Ravenhall Correctional Centre, a 1000-bed prison in Melbourne, Victoria, under contract with Corrections Victoria.
