= Nyandi Women's Prison =

Women's prison in Perth, Western Australia

- Interactive map of Nyandi Women's Prison
- Location: Bentley Western Australia; 32°00′03″S 115°53′47″E
- Status: Closed
- Security class: Minimum
- Opened: 1970
- Closed: 2004
- Managed by: Department of Justice, Western Australia

Nyandi Women's Prison was a correctional facility that became the Boronia Pre-release Centre for Women after its expansion in 2004. Located in Bentley, Western Australia, the prison was originally a juvenile detention centre for girls, and it was later used as a pre-release, low-security facility for women. It housed 50 women when the prison was expanded on the land formerly used by the Longmore Detention Centre. The women were moved to the new buildings when construction was complete in 2004. Since it closed as a prison, it is now used as the Corrective Services Academy for training Corrective Services Staff.
