= Metropolitan Remand Centre =

Prison in Victoria, Australia

Coordinates: 37°47′34″S 144°44′46″E

- Interactive map of Metropolitan Remand Centre
- Location: Ravenhall, Victoria
- Capacity: 954
- Opened: April 2006
- Managed by: Corrections Victoria

The Metropolitan Remand Centre (abbreviated and commonly referred to as MRC) is an Australian prison located at Ravenhall, Victoria, approximately 20 kilometres from the Melbourne CBD on the Western Freeway (Deer Park Bypass). The prison is a maximum security remand facility which opened in April 2006 and is operated by the Victorian Department of Justice and Community Safety.

The majority of MRC's inmates are held awaiting the outcome of their court case, some inmates have been sentenced and are waiting for appeals to be heard and a small number are sentenced prisoners transferred to free up beds at HM Melbourne Assessment Prison.

== Accommodation ==
Accommodation consists of four 75-bed general (mainstream) units, one 100-bed protection unit (called Deakin), 200 beds in various units allocated for special needs such as vulnerable or young adult prisoners and a 13-bed management unit.

Two new units were built and commissioned in late 2014.

The inmates unit is divided into 3 areas (A, B and C) which are separated by the officer's post. Being located centrally, officers can monitor activities in each area at a glance.

== Incidents ==
On 30 June 2015, 400 prisoners at the centre rioted, the largest riot in Victoria's history, the day before the implementation of a smoking ban across all prisons in Victoria. The prison was also overcrowded housing 918 prisoners when it was designed to house 613. Inmates attacked guards with rocks and tear gas, made makeshift weapons, broke into the Central Control Movement, lit numerous fires, damaged cell doors, damaged internal security, fire and communication panels, and rammed internal gates with vehicles. Corrections Victoria locked down all Victorian prisons. The riot was resolved after 15 hours with prisoners surrendering to the Corrections Victoria Security and Emergency Services Group (SESG) after they entered the prison supported by the Victoria Police Critical Incident Response Team (CIRT), and police Air Wing helicopter overhead and on the perimeter by police Special Operations Group (SOG) members with their armoured vehicle. Three staff received minor injuries and up to six prisoners were injured with the damage to the prison estimated to be between $10 and $12 million.
