= Cleveland Youth Detention Centre =

Youth detention centre in Queensland, Australia

Coordinates: 19.2491°S 146.7851°E

The Cleveland Youth Detention Centre is a youth detention centre at Rowes Bay in Townsville, Queensland, Australia. It is the only youth detention centre in regional Queensland. It has a capacity of 110 children. The Department of Youth Justice and Victim Support is responsible for the centre.The detention centre was established in 1980.

Each cell contains a bed, toilet, shower, desk and a shelf. Bedding and toiletries are supplied. Each child is given breakfast, morning tea, lunch, afternoon tea and dinner. Phone calls of up to 10 minutes at a time totaling 120 minutes of call time each week are permitted.

Children are assigned a caseworker. Youth detention centres in Queensland have an education and training centre, which detainees are required to participate in five days a week. The centre has experienced chronic staff shortages which has led to the use of solitary confinement.

In 2019, 12 new beds were added to the centre.

== See also ==
- Punishment in Australia
