= Ravenhall Correctional Centre =

Male prison in Ravenhall, Victoria, Australia

Coordinates: 37.7874286°S 144.7413394°E

- Interactive map of Ravenhall Correctional Centre
- Location: Ravenhall, Victoria
- Status: Operational
- Security class: Medium (with 75 bed maximum security area)
- Capacity: 1300
- Managed by: GEO Group Australia

Ravenhall Correctional Centre is a medium-security male prison currently located in Ravenhall, Victoria, Australia. The prison is able to house over 1300 prisoners, and includes capacity for 75 forensic prisoners. It is Victoria's largest prison. The prison is operated by GEO Group Australia, under contract to the Victorian Government.

== History ==
Planning for a new prison at Ravenhall began in late 2012 amid a large growth in the number of prisoners in Victoria. The prison would be the third privately operated prison in Victoria. Shortlisting for the tender on the project was completed in December 2013, and in August 2014, the GEO Consortium – made up of GEO Group Australia, John Holland, Honeywell, Capella Capital and GEO Care – was successful in obtaining the $670 million contract to build the prison. GEO Group Australia already currently operates Fullham Correctional Centre, the medium security prison located in Sale, Victoria.

It is expected that the prison will cost $6.3 billion to operate over the course of its 25-year contract. The contract includes provisions ensuring the operator, GEO Group Australia, will receive up to $2 million per year in bonuses for recidivism rates 12 per cent lower than other Victorian prisons.

Construction on the prison began in February 2015 and, following its completion, the prison was officially opened in October 2017.

== Accommodation ==
The prison currently holds approximately 970 prisoners, and has the capacity for up to 1600. Within this figure, the prison is approximately 70% remandees and 30% sentenced prisoners. The prison has a 75-bed maximum security mental health unit, providing facilities for forensic prisoners.

Accommodation facilities within the prison include both cells – made up of pre-constructed "Lego-block" style modules to avoid damage caused by the type of riots experienced at other Victorian prisons – and four and six bed dormitories.
