= HM Prison Sale =

Prison in Victoria, Australia 1864–1997

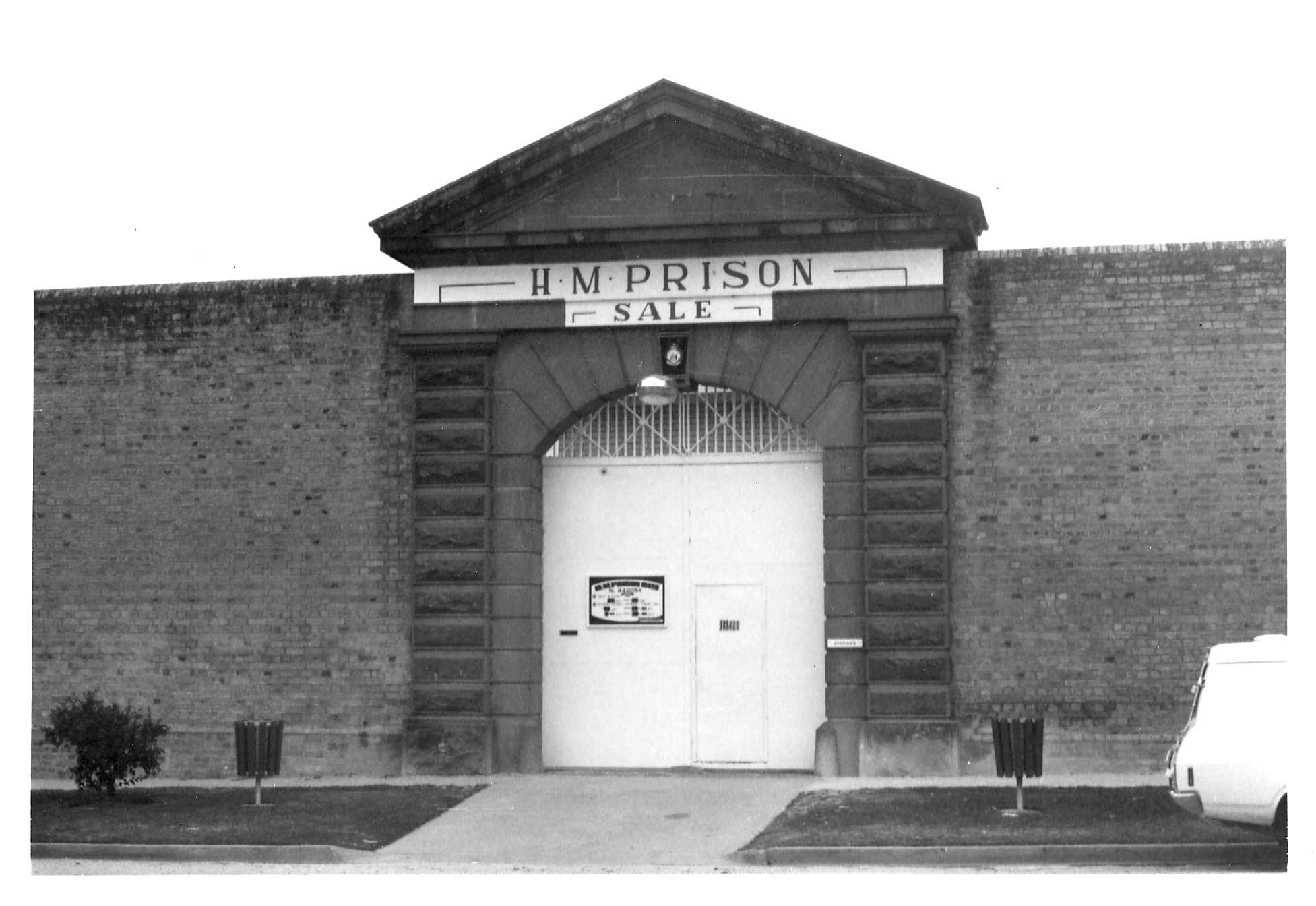
- HM Prison Sale entrance Reeve Street 1979. Photo taken by John T Collins. Provided by the State Library of Victoria
- Interactive map of HM Prison Sale
- Location: Sale, Victoria; 38.1111°S 147.0605°E
- Status: Closed
- Opened: 1887
- Closed: April 1997
- Managed by: Corrections Victoria

HM Prison Sale was a prison in Sale, Victoria, Australia. The prison was first proclaimed on the 28 October 1864, and the stone for the prison was prepared near Port Albert. That proclamation was revoked on 28 October 1887. A new prison was proclaimed on the 2nd of September, 1881, construction was completed in 1882. The prison was opened when William Gardner was appointed Governor on the 1st of July 1887. The Sale prison remained on that site until it closed in April 1997. The site now houses the Sale Police Station, which features some of the old prison walls.

Demolition halted for several months due to a legal battle, but resumed soon after.

== See also ==
- Fulham Correctional Centre
