= HM Prison Loddon =

Prison in Victoria, Australia

Coordinates: 37°4′58″S 144°14′21″E

Australian Prisons
HM Prison Loddon Complex
Location:	Castlemaine, Victoria
Status:	Operational
Classification:	Low & Medium Security
Capacity:	468 (Loddon) + 248 (Middleton) Total = 715
Opened:	August 1990
Closed:
Managed by:	Corrections Victoria

HM Prison Loddon is an Australian low-medium security prison, located in Central Victoria, Australia, approximately four kilometres from the centre of Castlemaine and 128 km north-west of Melbourne.

Loddon is a campus-style prison, within a secure perimeter, providing accommodation for 468 medium-security prisoners. The landscaped grounds, modern buildings and wide range of programs and activities provide an environment and facilities which, as closely as possible, resembles those available in the general community.

In July 2014 Loddon prison expanded adding a new unit Middleton which is a restricted-minimum rated men's prison. Prisoners at Middleton live in self-catered, cottage-style accommodation where they are responsible for cooking their own meals. Middleton has a capacity of 248.

== History ==
Loddon Prison was the second Victorian prison designed specifically for unit management, following Barwon Prison which was opened earlier the same year. Construction began in February 1988 and cost $29 million. The first prisoners arrived in August 1990 after the closure of the Old Castlemaine Gaol.

== Drug-free policy ==
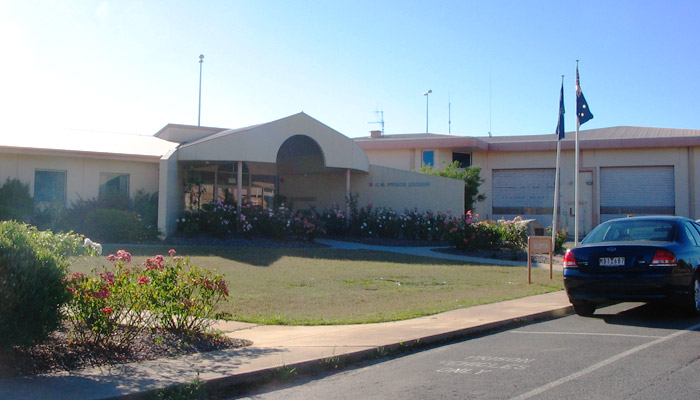
The main entrance of Loddon Prison.

Loddon was established as a drug-free prison from 1 July 1993. Additional procedures are in place to enforce the drug-free policy and to encourage prisoners to remain drug-free.

Prisoners at a drug-free prison must:

- Agree to undergo regular and random urine testing and participate in programs, as decided upon with case managers.
- Any prisoner at Loddon who tests positive to drugs or alcohol or refuses a urine test will be transferred immediately, as will any prisoner who is found guilty of a prison offence related to drugs or alcohol.

== Release of gorse spider mite ==
In 1998 as part of a biocontrol program, the gorse spider mite (Tetranychus lintearius) was first released on this site to control gorse (Ulex europaeus).
