= Old Castlemaine Gaol =

Prison in Victoria, Australia 1861–1990

Coordinates: 37°3′43″S 144°12′41″E

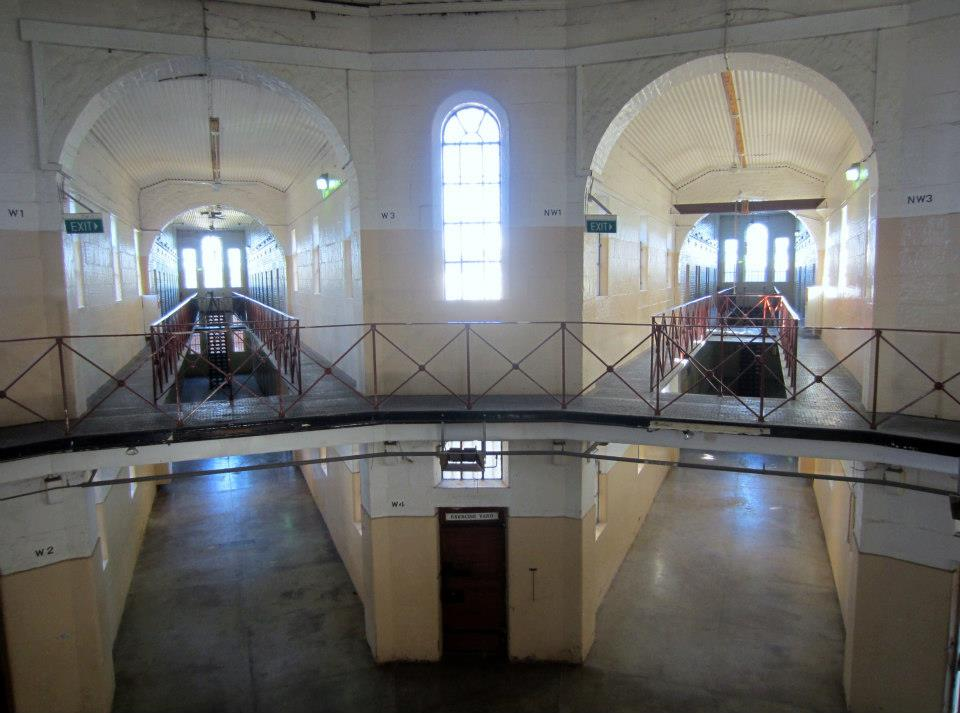
- Interactive map of Old Castlemaine Gaol
- Location: Castlemaine, Victoria
- Opened: 1861
- Closed: August 1990

The Old Castlemaine Gaol is a former prison, located in Castlemaine, Victoria, Australia. The building was modelled on Pentonville prison in London, replacing the original, designed by Inspector General John Price, which was never occupied. Built in 1861 to house offenders from the goldfields and nearby towns, it served various functions in the penal system before it was closed in 1990 and its prisoners transferred to HM Prison Loddon.

From 1861 to 1908, the gaol housed all manner of criminals, including lunatics and debtors, and ten men were hanged within the walls. In the later of these years however, the gaol housed mostly short-term prisoners and first-time offenders.

Between 1909 and 1951, the gaol was converted into a reformatory school for boys aged between 16 and 25. Most were under 21.

The gaol then closed for a number of years, before reopening in 1954 to accommodate medium-security prisoners from across the state. It remained open until August 1990.

After it ceased prison operations, it was used as a hotel and tourist attraction. It served as the studio for local community radio station WMA FM/Main FM 94.9 as well as various small businesses.

In 2018, the old gaol was sold to artist David Bromley.

The grounds were originally landscaped by renowned landscape gardener Hugh Linaker.

== Notable prisoners ==
- Peter Dupas, who was serving a life sentence for multiple murder and rape.
- Greek illusionist, Alexander Canaris, served three months for larceny in 1889–1890.

== Notable wardens ==
- From around 1868 to 1875, Thomas Francis Hyland, later a very successful wine industry businessman of Penfolds fame, was the notoriously hard-driving governor of the gaol. Under his tutelage, prisoners were obliged to work or do without rations. Within a few years, not only the gaol, but the town of Castlemaine had been transformed by their efforts and his organisational skills.

== Executions ==
Name	Year of birth	Date of execution	Crime
David Young	1831	21 August 1865	Murder of Margaret Graham
Long Poy		10 March 1866	
William H Terry		31 July 1867	
John Hogan	1815	14 August 1868	
Ah Pew		23 May 1870	Murder of Elizabeth Annie Hunt
James Wilkie	1844	20 May 1872	
Samuel Wright	1813	11 March 1873	
Pierre Barbun	1841	20 May 1873	
Ah Kat		9 August 1875	
John Duffus	1820	22 May 1876	Criminal Assault of daughter
