= HM Prison Tarrengower =

Women's prison in Victoria, Australia

- Interactive map of HM Prison Tarrengower
- Location: Maldon, Victoria, Australia; 36.977°S 144.0476°E
- Status: Operational
- Security class: Minimum security
- Capacity: 78
- Opened: January 1988
- Managed by: Corrections Victoria
- Website: Official website

HM Prison Tarrengower is a women's prison located in Maldon, Victoria, Australia. It focuses on release preparation for the women, and provides them with programs and employment opportunities, also allowing them to build confidence and skill sets when it comes to gaining and maintaining employment both whilst in custody and also upon their release.

It offers legal training to empower women to be involved in community organisations following their release. It also has facilities for pregnant women and for babies to stay with their mothers.

== History ==
Originally a farm, the prison was opened in January 1988 after the property was purchased and accommodation units were built. Tarrengower is the only minimum security female prison in Victoria. It is situated 136 km to the north of Melbourne, 2.5 km from the Maldon township.
