= Brisbane Women's Correctional Centre =

Prison in Queensland, Australia

Coordinates: 27°35′03.18″S 152°54′17.63″E

- Interactive map of Brisbane Women's Correctional Centre
- Location: Wacol, Queensland
- Status: Operational
- Security class: Women's prison
- Capacity: 270
- Opened: 28 May 1999
- Managed by: Queensland Corrective Services

Brisbane Women's Correctional Centre is a prison for women, located in the suburb of Wacol in Brisbane, Queensland, Australia. It was commissioned on 28 May 1999.

Brisbane Women's Correctional Centre replaced the original Brisbane Women's Correctional Centre, also located at Wacol. It took over inmates from HMP Brisbane Women, Dutton Park when it closed in 2000.

The prison has a capacity of 264 cells and is divided into two accommodation areas of 122 secure cells and 142 residential cells. The centre is the only reception, assessment and placement centre for female offenders in southern Queensland.

The centre accommodates female mainstream and protection prisoners and at times immigration detainees.

A purpose-built area accommodates up to eight women who are approved to have their children reside with them whilst in custody. In support of the accommodation of children within the facility and the role of women as primary carers, the centre facilitates a number of programs, activities, events and services related to women and children.

The centre has a structured daily program consisting of industry, education and vocational training programs that provide opportunities to address offending behaviour, and a comprehensive range of activities designed to enhance personal development and self esteem.

== Notable prisoners ==
- Cornelia Rau, suspected illegal immigrant unlawfully detained in 2004–2005.
- Tracey Wigginton (born 1965), 1989 murderer, known as the "Lesbian vampire killer".

== See also ==
- List of Australian prisons
