= Boronia Pre-release Centre for Women =

Prison in Perth, Western Australia

- Interactive map of Boronia Pre-release Centre for Women
- Location: Bentley, Western Australia; 32°00′11″S 115°53′50″E
- Status: Operational
- Security class: Minimum Security
- Capacity: 95 (as at 21 Oct 2015)
- Opened: May 2004
- Managed by: Department of Justice, Western Australia

Boronia Pre-release Centre for Women, opened in May 2004, is a correctional facility located in Bentley, Western Australia. It aims to offer support to low-security women prisoners preparing for reintegration into the community. It was built on the site of the former Longmore juvenile facility, which closed in 1997.

Prisoners at Bandyup Women's Prison who have achieved a rating of Minimum Security serve out their sentence at Boronia. By housing them in an environment that closely mirrors life outside of prison it attempts to allow for a less traumatic transition back to normal life. Staff help facilitate training of the prisoners and try to arrange employment on their release in conjunction with local businesses as a measure to prevent recidivism.
