= Hopkins Correctional Centre =

Australian medium security prison

- Interactive map of Hopkins Correctional Centre
- Location: Ararat, Victoria, Australia; 37.278°S 142.9815°E
- Status: Operational
- Security class: Medium
- Capacity: 762 (as at 30 June 2019)
- Opened: 1967 as HM Ararat Prison)
- Managed by: Corrections Victoria
- Website: www.corrections.vic.gov.au/prisons/hopkins-correctional-centre

Hopkins Correctional Centre is an Australian medium security protection prison for males, located in Ararat, Victoria, approximately 200 kilometres (120 mi) west of Melbourne. The centre is operated by Corrections Victoria, part of the Department of Justice of the Victorian Government.

The centre accepts prisoners convicted of an indictable offence under Victorian and/or Commonwealth legislation, including a high proportion of sex offenders and protection or special needs prisoners.

== History ==
Initially known as HM Ararat Prison, the prison was opened in 1967, replacing the century-old Ballarat Gaol. Built at an initial cost of A$1.25 million, an ongoing redevelopment program has included a new external security fence, new kitchen and mess room, major industries complex, new accommodation and program areas, and a new visit centre.

In November 2011, the Minister for Corrections and for Crime Prevention, Andrew McIntosh announced that the name of the centre would change to the Hopkins Correctional Centre in recognition of the major contribution made to its operation by the local community. The opportunity was taken to rename the prison as part of the project to add 350 beds to the complex, which was due to be completed in December 2012. A new transition centre has opened, accommodating 40 beds. The facility was expected to add an additional 150 jobs to the region, adding to the existing 160 full-time staff at the centre. The extension was officially opened on 15 October 2015. The Hopkins River is located in the area surrounding Ararat.

== Notable prisoners ==
- Gerald Ridsdale, former Catholic priest, believed to be Australia's most prolific child sex abuser
- Brian Keith Jones – also known as Mr Baldy, originally released on parole July 2005.
- Michael Glennon, convicted child molester, died there on 1 January 2014
