= Brisbane Youth Detention Centre =

Youth detention center in Wacol, Queensland, Australia

Coordinates: 27.5915°S 152.9131°E

The Brisbane Youth Detention Centre is a youth detention centre in Wacol, Queensland, Australia. It has a capacity of 306 children aged 10 to 18. The centre opened in 2001. The Department of Youth Justice and Victim Support is responsible for the centre.

Each cell contains a bed, toilet, shower, desk and a shelf. Bedding and toiletries are supplied. Each child is given breakfast, morning tea, lunch, afternoon tea and dinner. Phone calls of up to 10 minutes at a time totaling 120 minutes of call time each week are permitted.

Detainees are allocated chores like cleaning but there is no hard labour. Children are assigned a caseworker. Youth detention centres in Queensland have an education and training centre, which detainees are required to participate in five days a week.

== History ==
On 30 January 2017, seven detainees were involved in a riot. They forced themselves on to the roof of an accommodation unit and caused severe damage to the centre's infrastructure as well as injuring staff.

== See also ==
- List of Australian prisons
- Punishment in Australia
