= Wacol =

- Suburb
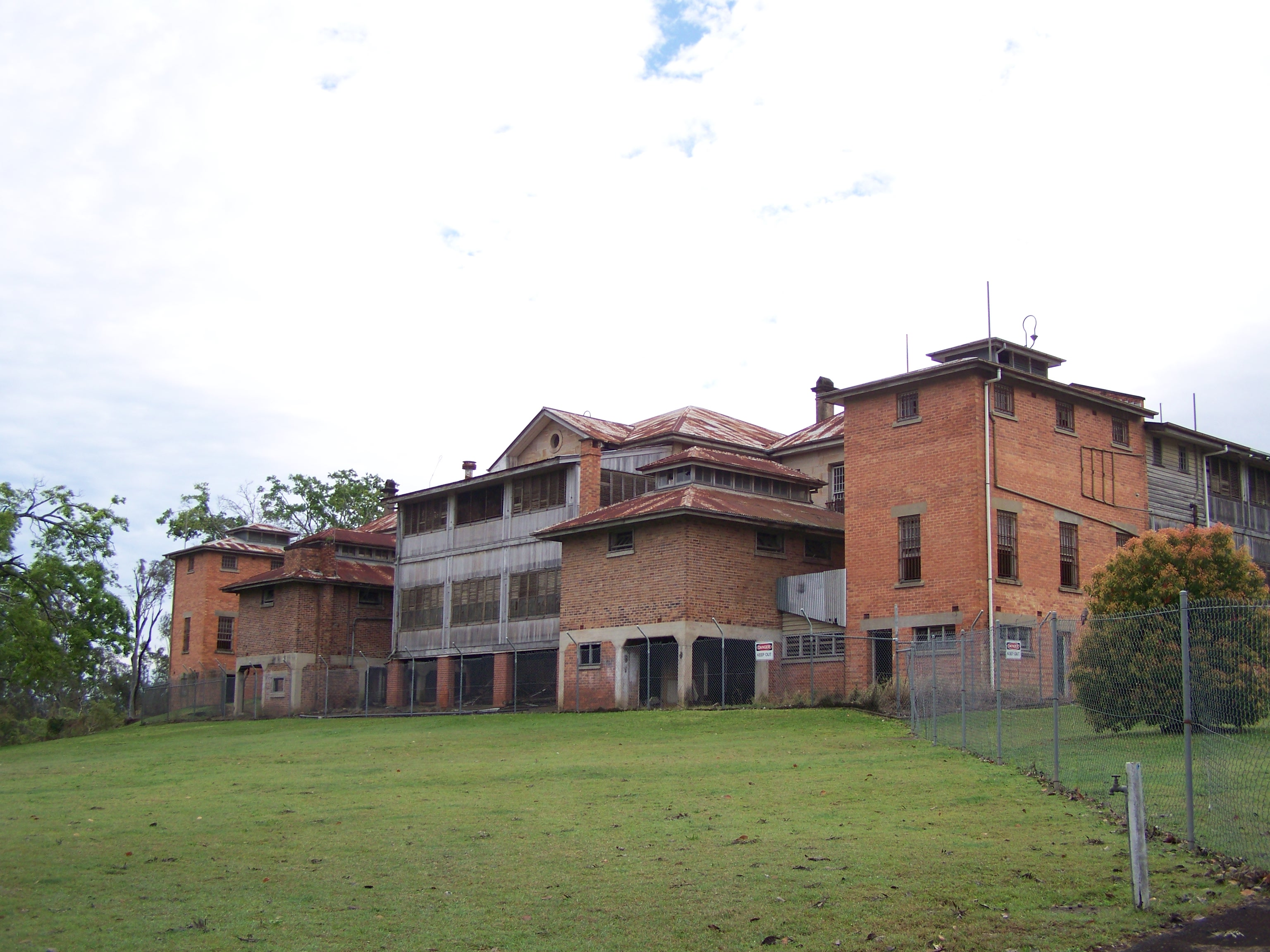
- The Park Centre for Mental Health, 2010

- Interactive map of Wacol
- Coordinates: 27.5830°S 152.9205°E
- Country: Australia
- State: Queensland
- City: Brisbane
- LGA: City of Brisbane (Jamboree Ward)
- Location: 21.3 km (13.2 mi) SW of Brisbane CBD

Government
  - State electorate: Inala
  - Federal division: Oxley

Area
  - Total: 18.2 km^{2} (7.0 sq mi)

Population
  - Total: 4,253 (2021 census)
  - Density: 233.7/km^{2} (605.2/sq mi)
- Time zone: UTC+10:00 (AEST)
- Postcode: 4076
Suburbs around Wacol
Riverhills	Sumner	Darra
Moggill	Wacol	Richlands
Goodna; Gailes	Ellen Grove; Carole Park	Forest Lake

Wacol is a suburb in the City of Brisbane, Queensland, Australia. In the 2021 census, Wacol had a population of 4,253 people.

== Geography ==
Wacol is bounded to the west by the Brisbane River and to the north loosely by Wolston Creek. It is 18 kilometres (11 mi) south-west of the Brisbane central business district.

The Brisbane-Ipswich railway line enters the suburb from the north-east (Darra), via Wacol railway station in the centre of the locality (27.5892°S 152.9243°E) and Gailes railway station in the south-west of the locality (27.6022°S 152.9191°E), before exiting to the south-west (Goodna / Gailes).

The suburb includes the undeveloped Cockatoo Island (27.5880°S 152.8997°E) in the Brisbane River.

Termination Hill is a 40 metres (130 ft) peak in the south of the suburb (27.6013°S 152.9136°E).

== History ==
Termination Hill was named by explorer John Oxley at the termination point of his first voyage up the Brisbane River in December 1823.

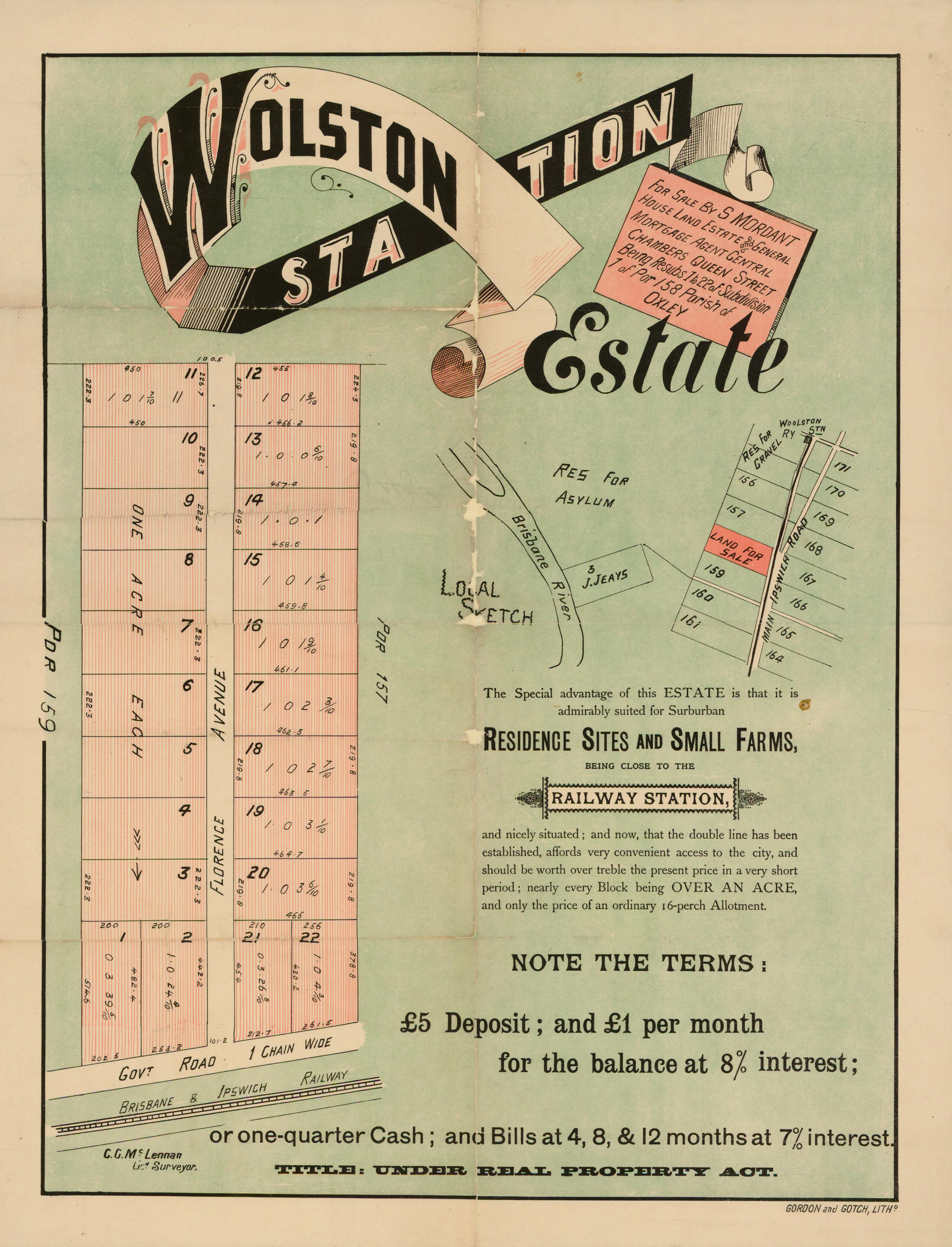
Real estate map of Wolston Station Estate, circa 1900

Wolston House was opened in 1852. Still intact today the building is the only surviving early Brisbane River settlement. The building was planned to be demolished however the National Trust of Queensland intervened to save the building. Major conservation work was undertaken.

The Wolston railway station was opened on 8 October 1874, taking its name from Wolston House. However, the name caused confusion with the Wilston railway station, so it was renamed on 8 July 1927 to Wacol railway station. Wacol is a coined word from weigh coal, as the principal purpose of the station was coal handling. The suburb takes its name from its railway station.

A portion of Wacol comes from the Wolston Estate, consisting of 54 farms on an area of 3000 acres, offered for auction at Centennial Hall, Brisbane, on 16 October 1901. Wolston Estate is the property of M. B. Goggs, whose father obtained the land forty years previously in the 1860s and after whom Goggs Road is named. Only three of the farms sold at the original auction.

In 1879, the local government area of Yeerongpilly Division was created. In 1891, parts of Yeerongpilly Division were excised to create Sherwood Division becoming a Shire in 1903 which contained the area of Wolston Estate. In 1925, the Shire of Sherwood was amalgamated into the City of Brisbane.

The suburb played host to the American military during World War II, who constructed Camp Columbia (27.5833°S 152.9369°E) in 1942; after the war, control of the facility was transferred to the Australian Government which used it as a migrant reception and training centre from 1949 to 1987. Associated with the migrant centre was the Wacol East State School, which opened on 14 November 1949 as a "Special School for New Australians" and closed on 11 April 1963.

Carole Park State School opened on 17 September 1948.

Also, in the post-war period, the suburb increasingly became home to correctional and mental health facilities.

HM Prison Wacol opened in 1957 with a special wing for the Wacol Security Patients' Hospital (for the mentally ill). In 1988 it was renamed Wacol Correctional Centre, then in 1996 Moreton Correctional Centre. In 1999 it was closed and rebuilt as the Wolston Correctional Centre.

In 1984, the Sir Leslie Wilson Youth Centre (a secure facility for young offenders and "troubled" children, formerly known as the Wilson Youth Hospital) and its associated Sir Leslie Wilson School relocated from Windsor to Wacol. In 1994 it was renamed the Sir Leslie Wilson Youth Detention Centre in 1994.

Barrett Adolescent Centre Special School opened on 29 January 1985. It provided education for children with mental health issues. It closed as a full-time school in 2013, but was relocated to Tennyson where it provides part-time support to children with mental health issues but who remain enrolled full-time in other schools.

The John Oxley Youth Detention Centre opened at 139 Wacol Road in 1987. On 15 July 1994 John Oxley School opened to provide education to children held in the John Oxley centre.

More correctional facilities followed with Sir David Longland Correctional Centre opening at 234 Wacol Station Road in 1988. In 1990 the former migrant reception centre site was cleared for the construction of the Arthur Gorrie Correctional Centre in 1992. The Wolston Correctional Centre and the Brisbane Women's Correctional Centre both opened in 1999. The Brisbane Youth Detention Centre opened in January 2001 as an amalgamation of Sir Leslie Wilson and John Oxley facilities. In 2007 the Brisbane Correctional Centre opened as a redevelopment of the Sir David Longland facility.

In December 2011, the Royal Society for the Prevention of Cruelty to Animals moved from their premises in Fairfield to Wacol.

== Demographics ==
In the 2011 census, Wacol had a population of 2,957 people.

In the 2016 census, Wacol recorded a population of 3,761 people; 18.9% female and 81.1% male. The median age in Wacol was 33 years, 5 years below the Australian median. There was a marked over-representation of people aged between 20 and 44 years in Wacol, where they accounted for 68.6% of the population, compared to the national figure of 34.6%. The young and old were under-represented: children aged under 15 years made up just 2.9% of the population (18.7% nationally) and people aged 65 years and over made up 5.2% of the population (nationally 15.8%). 79.4% of people living in Wacol were born in Australia, compared to the national average of 66.7%; the next most common countries of birth were New Zealand 6.4%, Vietnam 1.9%, England 1.7%, Philippines 0.9%, Samoa 0.5%. 15.8% of people spoke only English at home; the next most popular languages were Vietnamese 1%, Tagalog 0.4%, Spanish 0.3%, Mandarin 0.3% and Italian 0.2%.

In the 2021 census, Wacol had a population of 4,253 people.

== Heritage listings ==
Wacol has a number of heritage-listed sites, including:

- 60 Grindle Road (27.5993°S 152.9103°E): Wolston Park Hospital (now the Park Centre for Mental Health)
- 223 Grindle Road (27.5741°S 152.9043°E): Wolston House

== Facilities ==
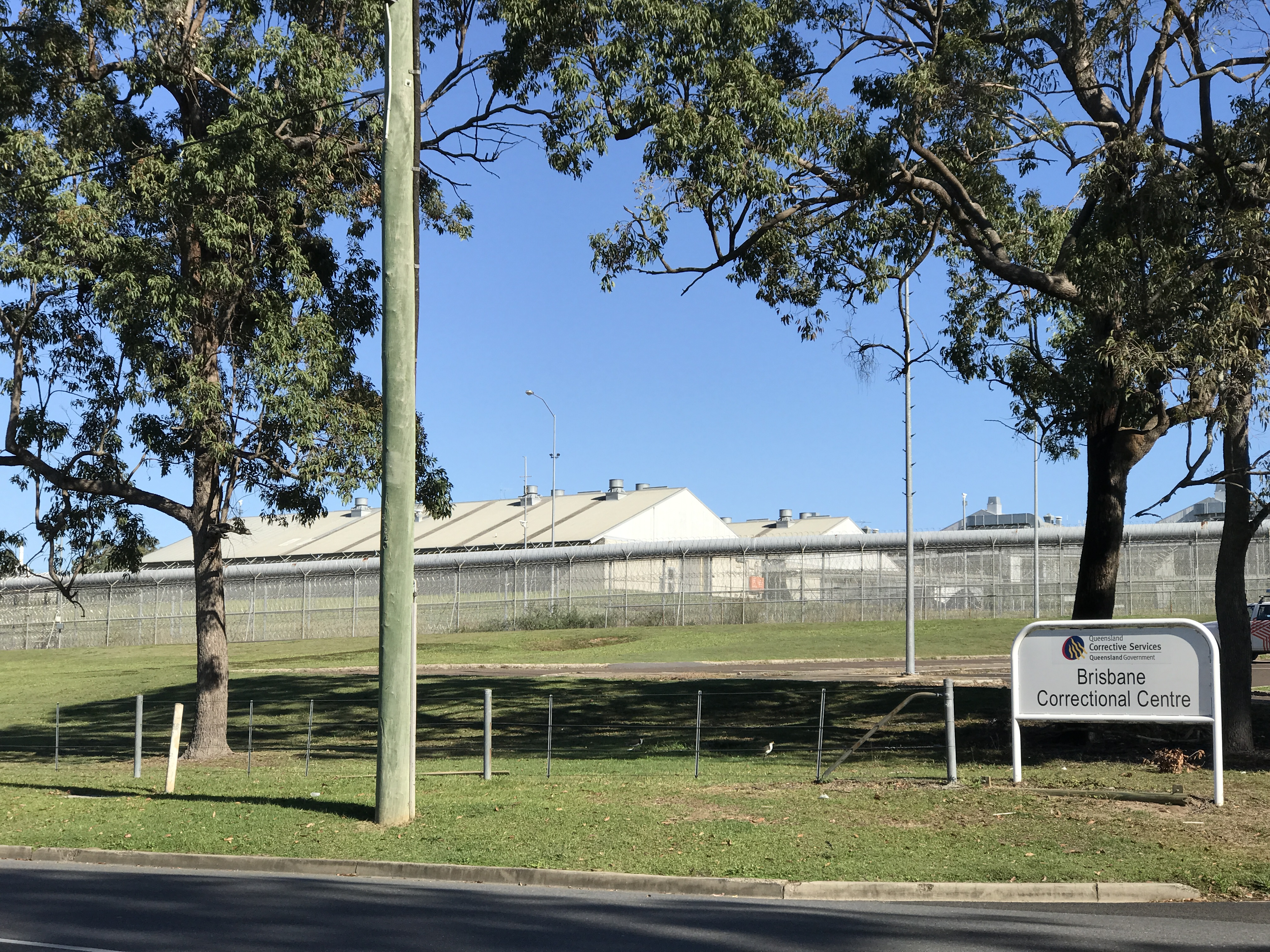
Brisbane Correctional Centre, 2017

Wacol is home for correctional centre inmates at:

- Arthur Gorrie Correctional Centre, a high security remand centre at 3068 Ipswich Road (27.5807°S 152.9345°E)
- Brisbane Correctional Centre (previously known as Sir David Longland Correctional Centre), high security prison at 234 Wacol Station Road (27.5810°S 152.9190°E)
- Brisbane Women's Correctional Centre, a high security prison for women at 176 Grindle Road (27.5839°S 152.9067°E)
- Brisbane Youth Detention Centre, a facility for 10- to 17-year-olds at 99 Wolston Park Road (27.5908°S 152.9124°E)
- Wolston Correctional Centre, a high security prison at 176 Grindle Road (27.5845°S 152.9036°E)

The Park Centre for Mental Health, formerly known as the Wolston Park Hospital, has acted as an institution for the mentally ill since 1865. It is at the corner of Ellerton Drive and Wolston Park Road (27.6007°S 152.9100°E) and can also be accessed from Ellerton Road.

The Royal Society for the Prevention of Cruelty to Animals operate their Brisbane animal hospital and adoption shelter at 139 Wacol Station Road (27.5859°S 152.9217°E).

Wacol Wastewater Treatment Plant is a sewage treatment plant at 176A Grindle Road (27.5806°S 152.9053°E). It is operated by Queensland Urban Utilities.

There is also a significant industrial park located in the area.

== Education ==
Carole Park State School is a government primary (Prep-6) school for boys and girls at 260 Waterford Road (27.6080°S 152.9336°E). In 2018, the school had an enrolment of 201 students with 16 teachers (14 full-time equivalent) and 27 non-teaching staff (15 full-time equivalent). It includes a special education program.

Brisbane Youth Education and Training Centre is a primary and secondary (6-12) educational unit for boys and girls at the Brisbane Youth Detention Centre, 99 Wolston Park Road (27.5924°S 152.9149°E). In 2018, the school had an enrolment of 124 students with 33 teachers (29 full-time equivalent) and 25 non-teaching staff (18 full-time equivalent).

There is no mainstream secondary school in Wacol; the nearest are Glenala State High School in Durack to the east, Forest Lake State High School in Forest Lake to the south-east, and Woodcrest State College in Springfield to the south.

== Amenities ==
Gailes Golf Club is an 18-hole golf course for members and visitors at 299 Wilruna Street (27.6027°S 152.9180°E).

Wolston Park Golf Club is an 18-hole golf course for members and visitors at Ellerton Drive (corner of Boyce Road, 27.6037°S 152.9049°E).

There are a number of parks in the area:

- M. Z. Holland Memorial Park at 57 Monterey Street (27.5927°S 152.9215°E)
- Newton Place Park at 26 Newton Place (27.5937°S 152.9183°E)
- PJ McIlwain Place at 221 Grindle Road (27.5769°S 152.9091°E), home ground of the Centenary Junior Rugby League
- Pooh Corner at 205 Wacol Station Road (27.5754°S 152.9283°E)
- Progress Road Park at 440 Progress Road (27.5961°S 152.9397°E)
- Wacol Bushlands at 3063 Ipswich Road (27.5744°S 152.9379°E)

== Transport ==
The Ipswich Motorway crosses the suburb. A major upgrade of the road was completed in 2010. The Logan Motorway connects to the Ipswich Motorway in the south of the suburb.

Wacol railway station and Gailes railway station (which, despite its name, is located in Wacol) provides access to regular Queensland Rail City network services to Brisbane, Ipswich and Rosewood via Ipswich.

In the 2011 census, 11.2% of employed people traveled to work on public transport and 66.3% by car (either as driver or as passenger).

== See also ==
- List of Brisbane suburbs
