= Fulham Correctional Centre =

Australian prison

Coordinates: 38°6′27″S 146°58′13″E

- Interactive map of Fulham Correctional Centre
- Location: Sale, Victoria
- Security class: Medium security
- Capacity: 800
- Opened: 7 April 1997
- Managed by: GEO Group Australia

Fulham Correctional Centre is a medium security Australian prison located in Hopkins Road, Sale, Victoria, Australia. The prison consists of mainstream medium and minimum (fenced and unfenced) security cell blocks, management (solitary), and a protection unit. It was built by Thiess Contractors and completed in 1997.

A 68-bed minimum security correctional facility call Nalu is located outside the main walls of Fulham. It is a state-funded facility that is run by GEO Group Australia, which runs Fulham as well.

It is set up as a special unit for first time young offenders aged 18–25 who are at minimum security rating. The facility is made up of small cottages which house four prisoners each. A second pre-release program at Nalu caters for all eligible inmates (regardless of age) at Fulham who are nearing release.

== See also ==
- HM Prison Sale
