= Queensland Corrective Services =

Queensland government agency

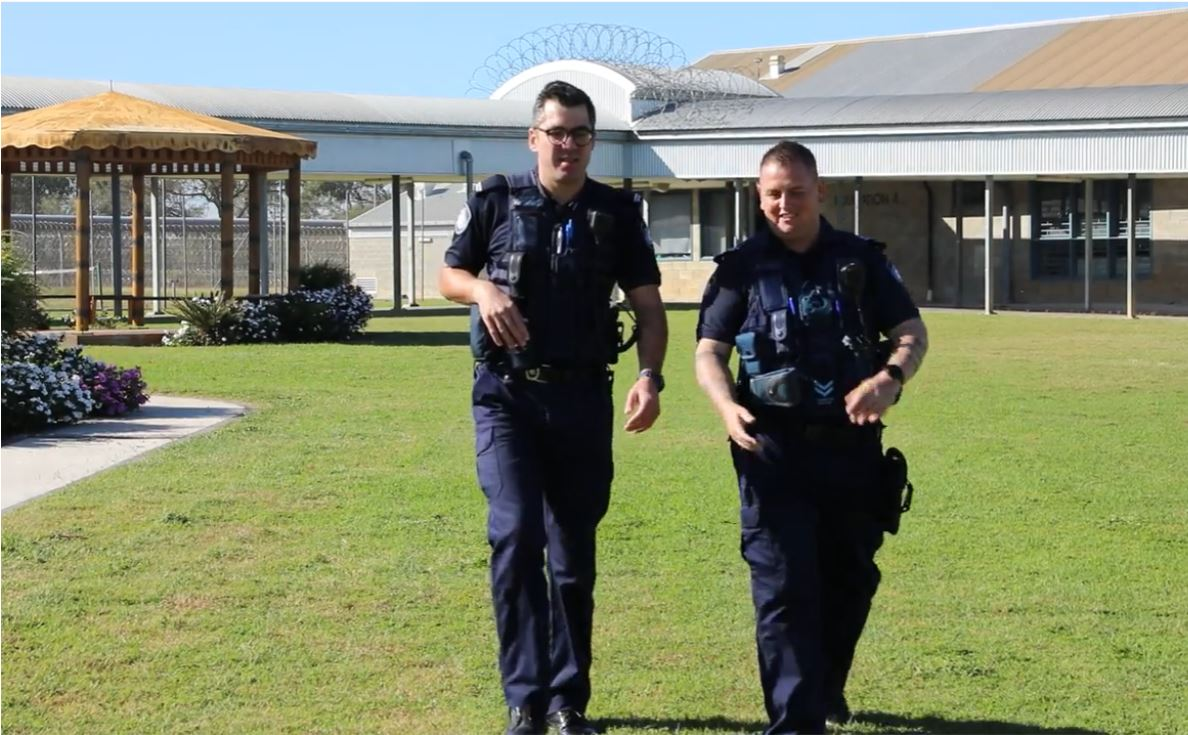
Capricornia Correctional Centre

Queensland Corrective Services (QCS) is a Queensland government agency responsible for the housing of inmates at Queensland correctional centres. It is an independent Queensland government agency that operates under the Corrective Services Act.

QCS operates eleven high security and six low security correctional centres across the state.

Keith Hamburger was director-general from 1988 to 1997. The role was formerly known as comptroller-general.

== See also ==
- List of prisons in Australia
- List of Queensland Government departments
