= List of Florida Atlantic University people =

This list of Florida Atlantic University people includes current students, former students, and graduates of Florida Atlantic University. Since its opening in 1964, Florida Atlantic has awarded degrees to over 185,000 alumni.

== Alumni ==
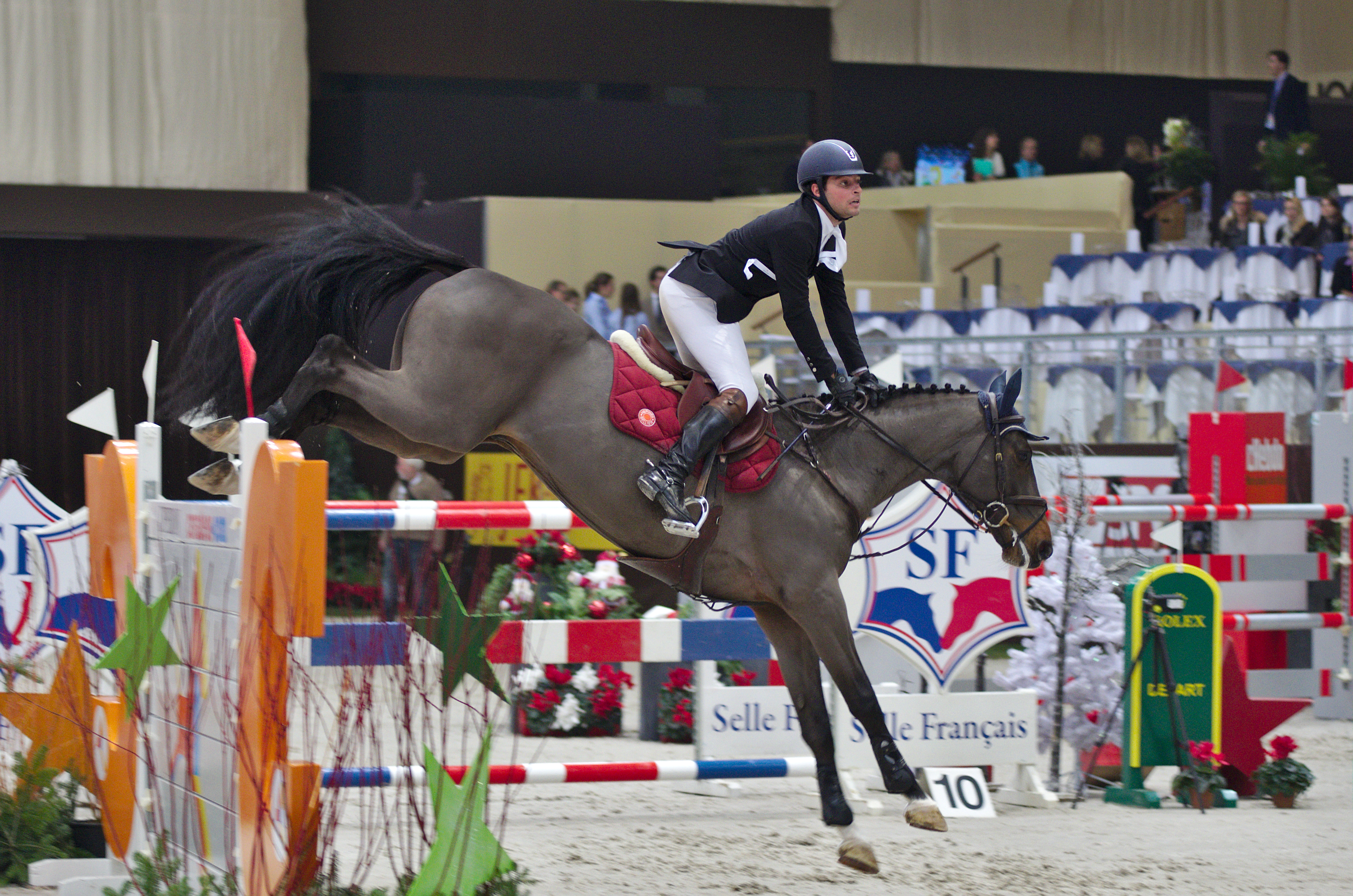
Olympic show jumping rider Daniel Bluman

=== Athletics ===
==== Football ====
Athlete	Notability
Azeez Al-Shaair	Professional football player for the San Francisco 49ers
Brandin Bryant	Professional football player for the Buffalo Bills
Harrison Bryant	2019 John Mackey Award Winner and 2019 Unanimous All-American; professional football player for the Cleveland Browns
Trevon Coley	Professional football player for the New York Jets
John Franklin III	Professional football player for the Tampa Bay Buccaneers, featured in the Netflix documentary series Last Chance U
Trey Hendrickson	Professional football player for the Cincinnati Bengals
Greg Joseph	Professional football player for the Minnesota Vikings
Mike Lockley	Former professional football player for the Jacksonville Jaguars
Herb Miller	Professional football player for the Tampa Bay Buccaneers
Alfred Morris	Professional football player; currently a free agent
Sharrod Neasman	Professional football player for the New York Jets
Ed Newman	National Football League All-Pro football player
James Pierre, Jr	Professional football player for the Pittsburgh Steelers
Keith Reaser	Professional football player for the Kansas City Chiefs
Devin "Motor" Singletary	Professional football player for the Buffalo Bills
Rashard Smith	Professional football player for the Philadelphia Eagles
Rusty Smith	Former professional football player for the Tennessee Titans; inducted into the FAU Hall of Fame in 2019
Adarius (Glanton) Taylor	Professional football player for the Carolina Panthers
Brandon Walton	Professional football player for the Pittsburgh Steelers
Lucky Whitehead	Former professional football player for the New York Jets
Kerrith Whyte	Professional football player; currently a free agent
Trevardo Williams	Professional football player; currently a free agent

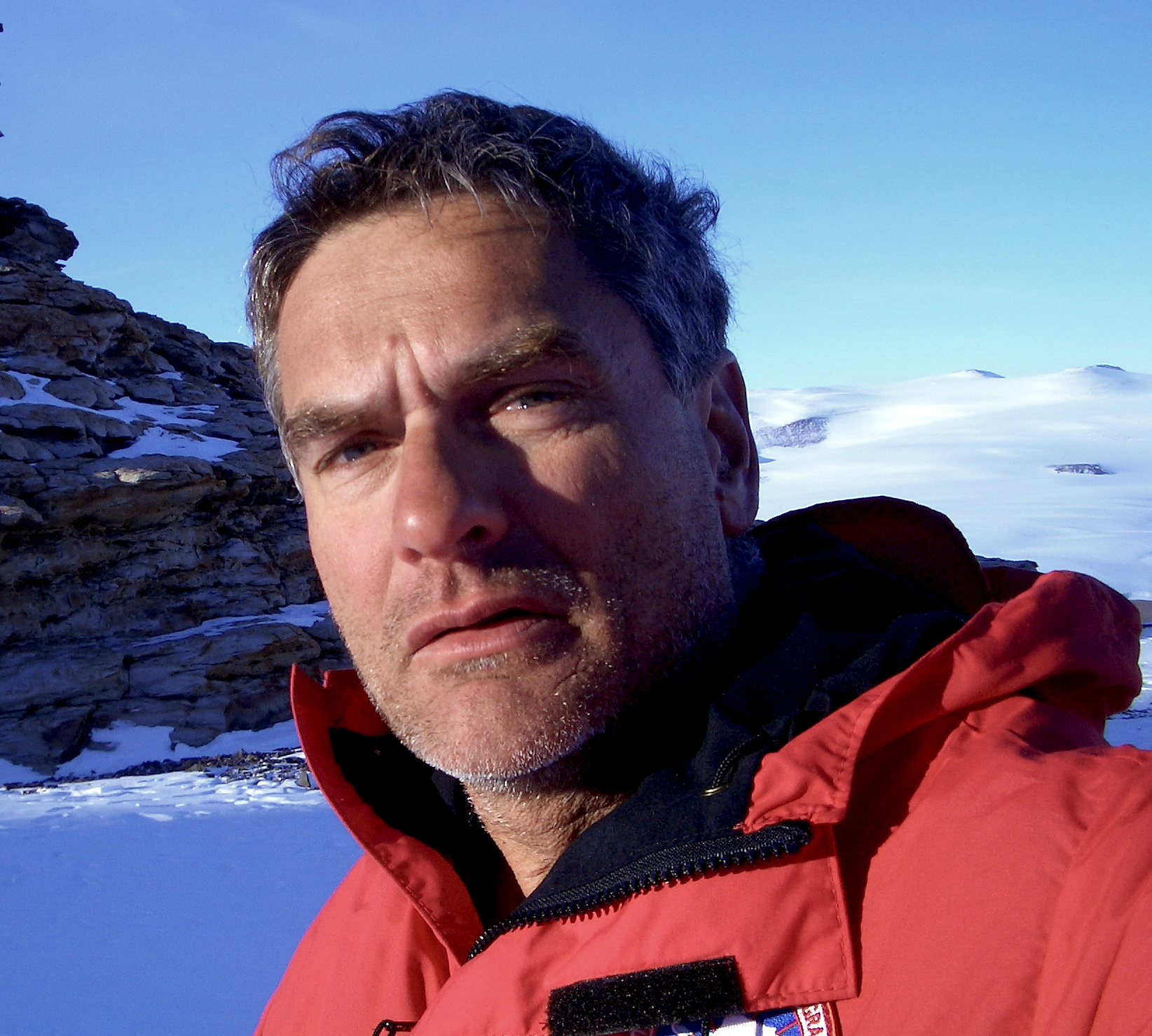
NASA scientist Christopher McKay

==== Major League Baseball ====
Athlete	Notability
Carmen Cali	Professional MLB pitcher
Jeff Fiorentino	Professional MLB outfielder
Tim Harikkala	Professional MLB pitcher
David McKay	Professional MLB pitcher
Tommy Murphy	Professional MLB outfielder
Robbie Widlansky	Professional MLB outfielder
Cody Wilson	Professional MLB outfielder

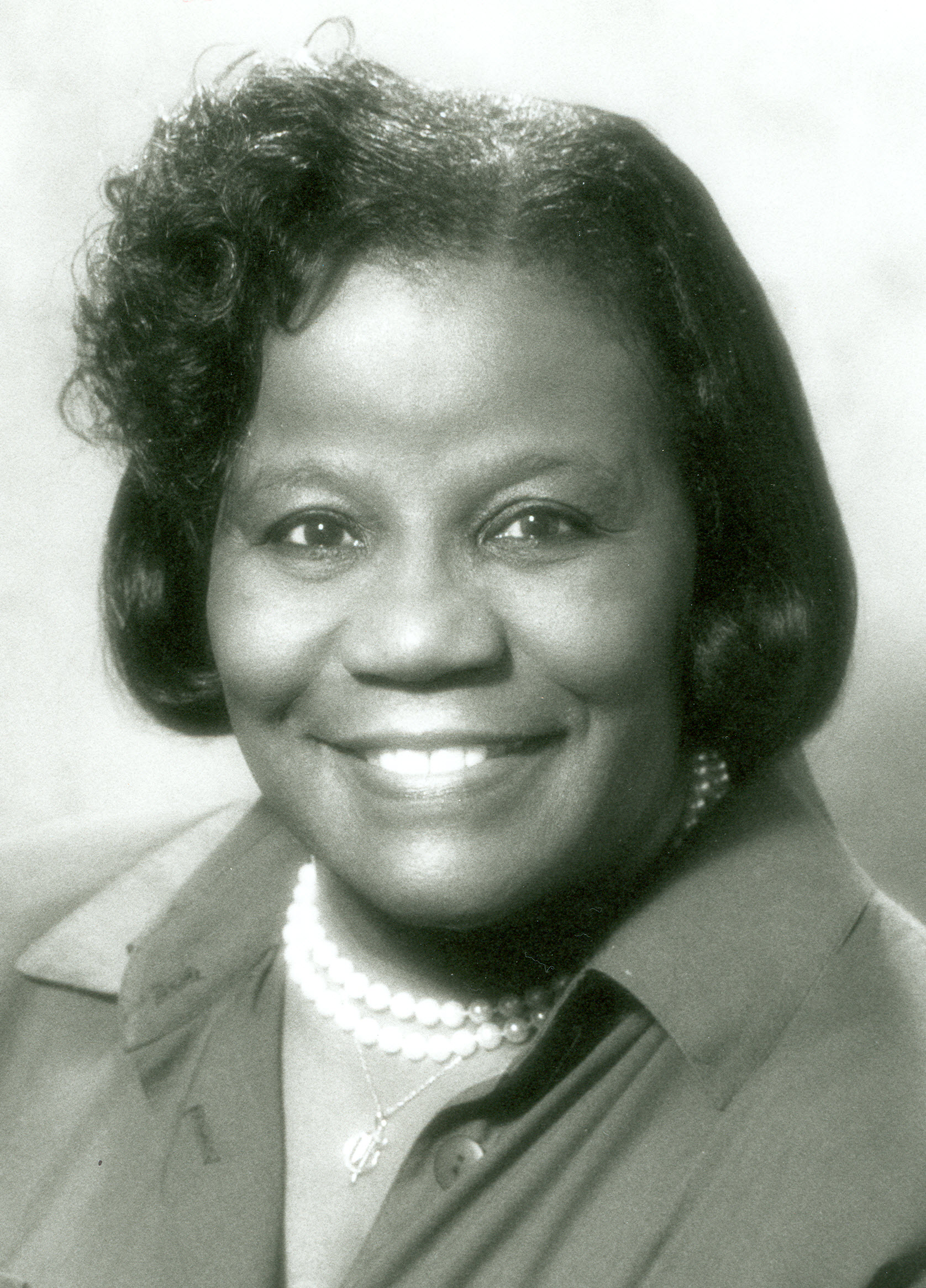
U.S. Congresswoman Carrie Meek

==== Rugby ====
Athlete	Notability
Mark Zupan	Captain of the United States quadriplegic wheelchair rugby team

==== Other sports ====
Alumni	Notability
Daniel Bluman	Colombian-born Israeli Olympic show jumping rider
Brittany Bowe	Team USA Olympic long track speedskater medalist; 1,000-meter world record holder
Yolanda Griffith	Professional basketball player in the WNBA
Fern "Peachy" Kellymeyer (M.A. 1974)	Professional tennis player, administrator, and 1999 ITA Hall of Fame inductee
Ben Silverman	Professional golfer
Tecia Torres	Professional mixed martial artist, current UFC strawweight
Max von Schlebrügge	Professional soccer player with 10 caps for the Sweden national team
Aleksandar Zečević	Serbian basketball player in the Israeli Basketball Premier League

=== Business ===
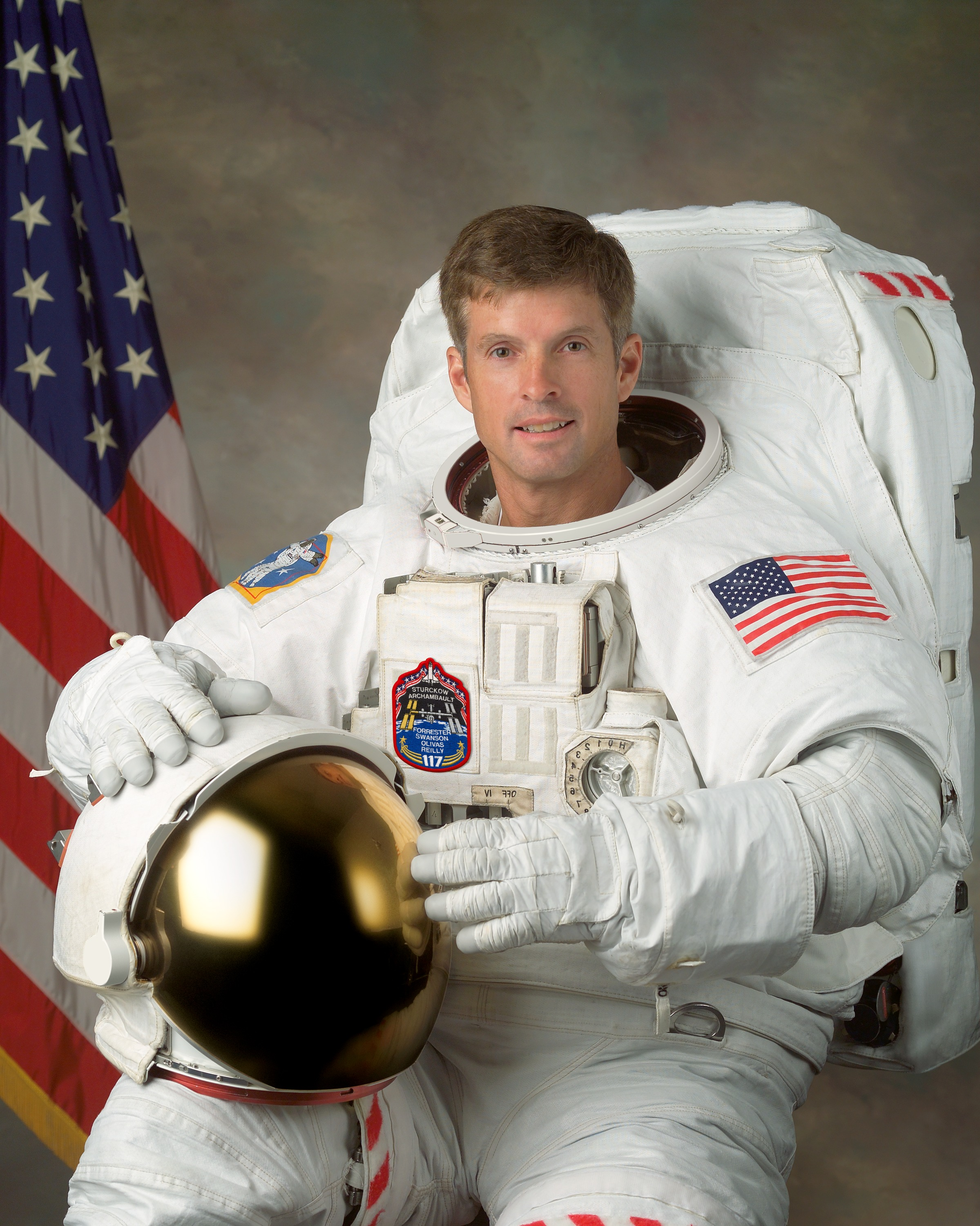
Astronaut Steven Swanson

Alumni	Notability
Rafael "Ralph" de la Vega (B.S. 1974)	Former vice chairman of AT&T Inc. and CEO of AT&T Business Solutions and AT&T International
Mark Dean (M.S.E.E. 1982)	Engineering professor at the University of Tennessee; co-developer of the IBM PC; former vice president of the Technical Strategy and Worldwide Operations, IBM Research
Richard DiMarchi (B.S. 1974)	Former vice president at Eli Lilly and Company, and current chairman in Biomolecular Sciences and professor of Chemistry at Indiana University
Patricia McKay (B.B.A. 1978)	Executive vice president and chief financial officer of Office Depot
Luis Alberto Moreno (B.B.A. 1975)	4th and current president of the Inter-American Development Bank
Robert "Skip" Orr (B.A. 1978)	Former president of Boeing Japan, and former vice president of Motorola
Maynard Webb (B.A.)	Member of the board of directors of Salesforce.com,; former chief operating officer and president of Technologies for eBay
Phil Zimmermann (B.S. 1978)	Creator of Pretty Good Privacy
George Zoley (B.A. 1972, M.P.A. 1975)	Chairman of the board, chief executive officer, and founder of the GEO Group, Inc., a publicly traded company that became independent from The Wackenhut Corporation

=== Education ===
Alumni	Notability
Wilson G. Bradshaw (B.S., M.S.)	President of Florida Gulf Coast University
Arthur C. Brooks (M.A., 1995)	Social scientist, economist, professor, author, and professional musician
Alberto "Al" Cardenas (B.A. 1969)	Attorney, Republican lobbyist, and trustee of Florida A&M
Keith Hamm (M.A., 1973)	Edwards Professor of Political Science at Rice University
George L. Hanbury (Ph.D.)	Executive vice president and chief Ooerating officer of Nova Southeastern University

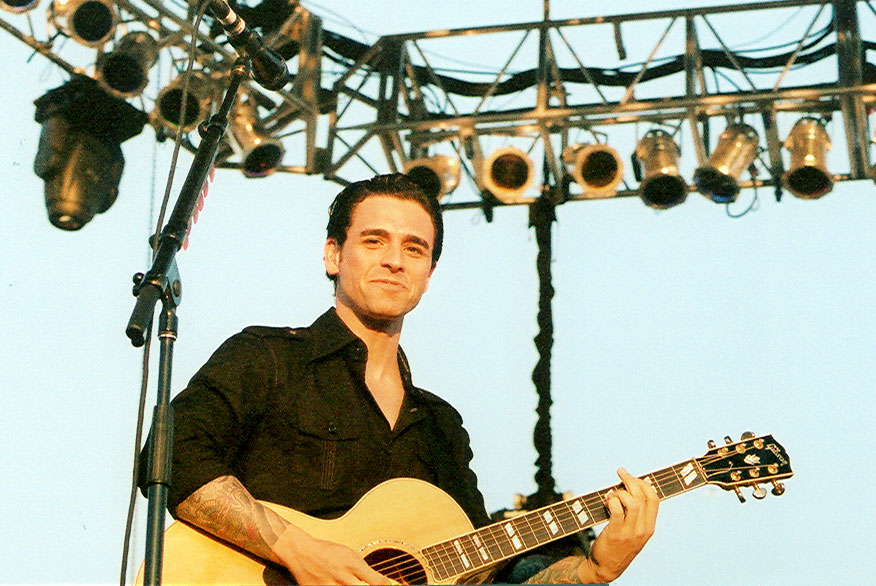
Singer-songwriter Chris Carrabba

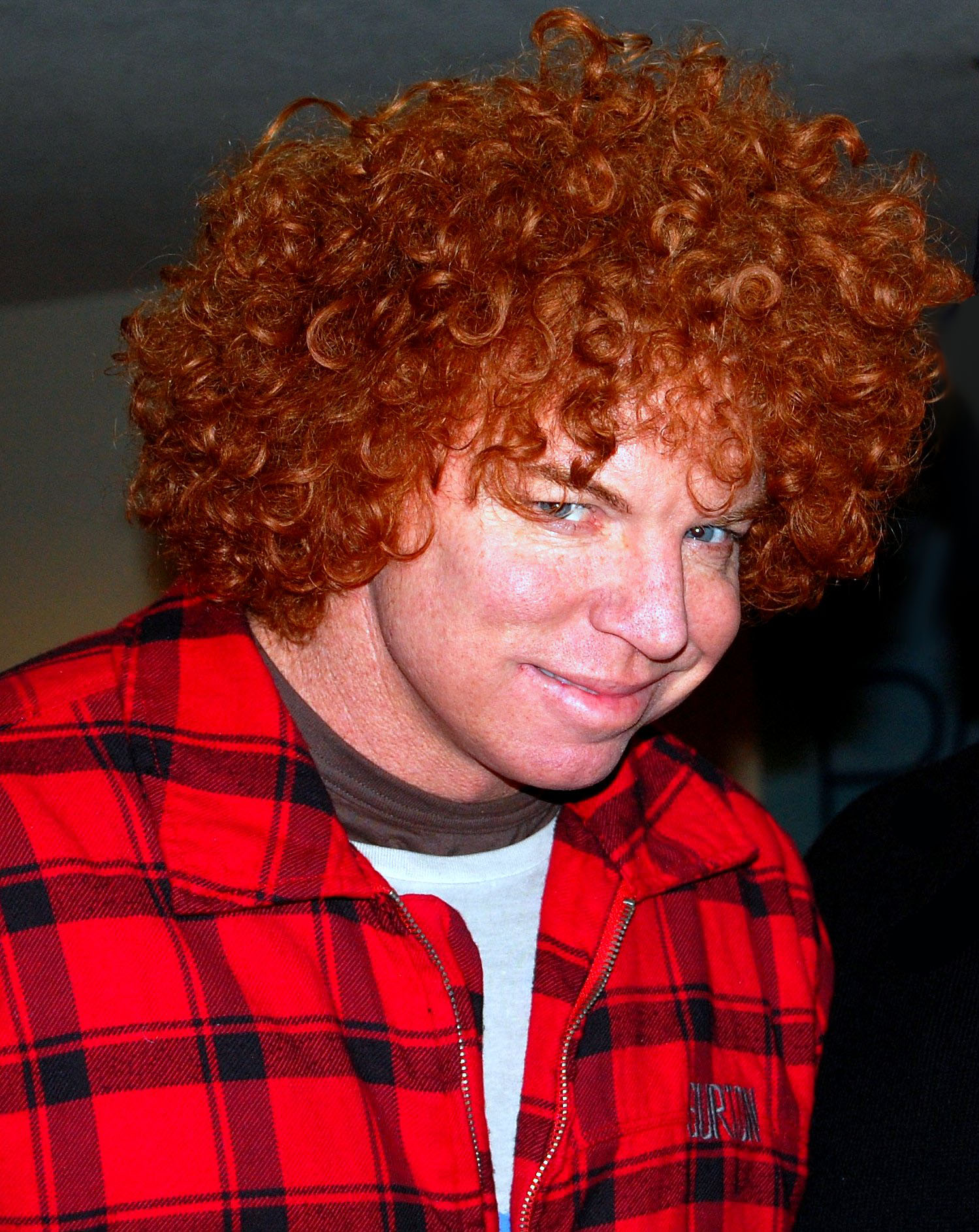
Actor/comedian Carrot Top

=== Entertainment ===
Alumni	Notability
Don Brewer (B.B.A. 1990)	Drummer and founding member of the band Grand Funk Railroad
Chris Carrabba	Singer-songwriter, Dashboard Confessional
Carrot Top (real name Scott Thompson) (B.A. Marketing)	Actor and stand-up comedian
Scott Henderson (B.A.)	Jazz, blues, and fusion guitarist, Tribal Tech
Marc Kudisch (B.F.A. 1988)	Broadway actor and two-time Tony Award nominee
Shannon Spake (B.A. Communications)	TV reporter and sports analyst currently hosting NASCAR Race Hub

=== Government ===
==== U.S. senators, governors, and lt. governors ====
Alumni	Notability
Frank Brogan (M.Ed. 1981)	Chancellor of the State University System of Florida, former lieutenant governor of Florida and president of Florida Atlantic University

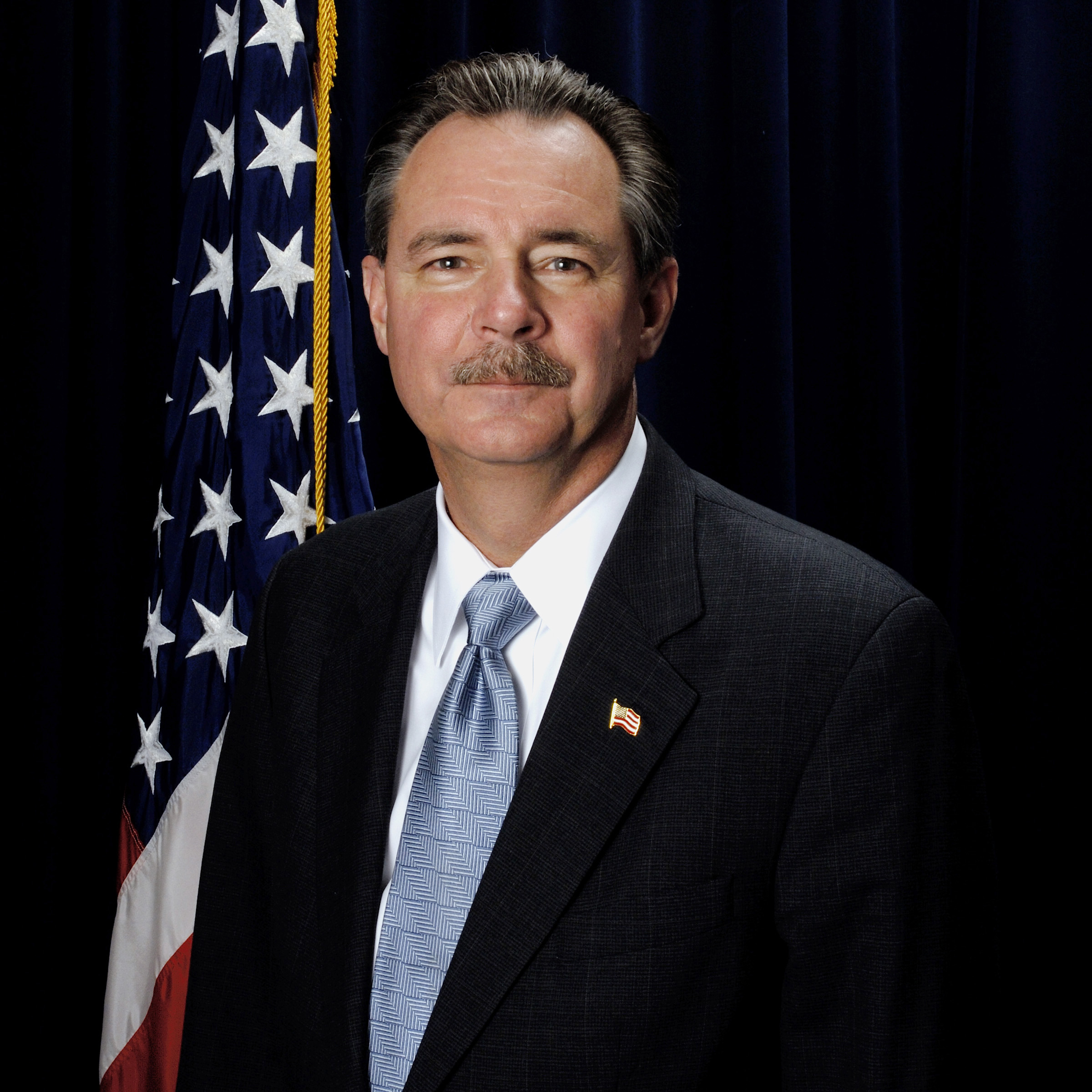
R. David Paulison

==== Cabinet members and federal officials ====
Alumni	Notability
R. David Paulison (B.A.)	Former undersecretary of the Federal Emergency Management Agency

==== U.S. congressmen ====
Alumni	Notability
Carrie P. Meek (Hon Ph.D.)	Former U.S. congresswoman from Florida's 17th district
Daniel A. Mica (B.A. 1966, Hon Ph.D.)	Former U.S. congressman, president and CEO of the Credit Union National Association

==== Judges, lawyers, and state officials ====
Alumni	Notability
Carol W. Hunstein (B.S. 1972)	Presiding justice of the Supreme Court of Georgia
Ken Jenne (B.A. 1968)	Former sheriff of Broward County, Florida, and former state legislator
Henry Latimer (M.A.)	First African American circuit court judge in Broward County, Florida

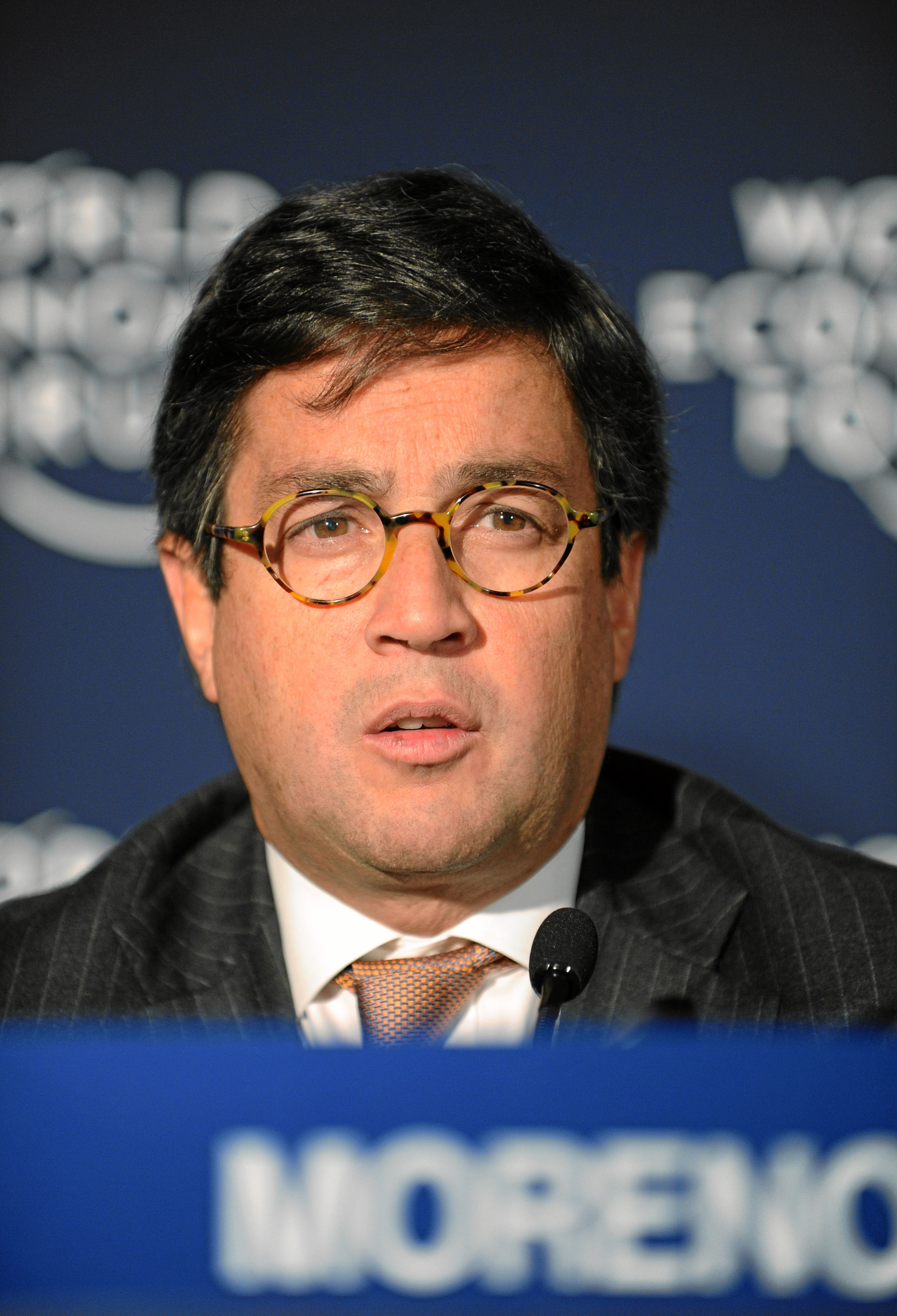
Luis Alberto Moreno, 4th and current president of the Inter-American Development Bank

==== Non-U.S. politicians ====
Alumni	Country	Notability
Alexis Jeffers	Saint Kitts and Nevis	Member of the Nevis Island Assembly, candidate for the National Assembly in the 2010 federal election

=== Literature ===
Alumni	Notability
Judith Ortiz Cofer (M.A. 1977)	Puerto Rican author
Kevin Crawford	Shakespeare scholar
Charles Ghigna	Poet and children's author known as "Father Goose"
Mirta Ojito	Cuban-born Pulitzer Prize–winning journalist for the New York Times and professor of journalism at the University of Miami

=== Medicine, science and technology ===
Alumni	Notability
Christopher McKay (B.A.)	Planetary scientist at NASA Ames Research Center
Steven Swanson (M.A. 1986)	NASA astronaut

== Faculty ==
- David F. Bjorklund, psychology professor, author, pioneer in evolutionary developmental psychology
- Maria Fadiman, associate professor, ethnobotanist and member of the 2006 National Geographic Emerging Explorers
- Kenneth A. Jessell, former senior vice president for financial affairs, interim university provost, interim vice president for university advancement and executive director of the FAU Foundation, associate university provost, associate dean in the College of Business Administration, and assistant professor in the Department of Finance and Real Estate
- Neal Justin, politician and professor of education
- J. A. Scott Kelso, neuroscientist, founder of the Center for Complex Systems and Brain Sciences
- Salvatore D. Morgera, former chair of Electrical Engineering, Fellow of the IEEE, Fellow of the AAAS, Tau Beta Pi Eminent Engineer; pioneer of the highly multidisciplinary Bioengineering Graduate Program at FAU; chair and professor, Department of Electrical Engineering, University of South Florida
- Walid Phares, author, national media commentator, and expert on global terrorism and Middle Eastern affairs
- Richard Shusterman, professor of Philosophy, pragmatist philosopher, Dorothy F. Schmidt Eminent Scholar in the Humanities, and founder and director of the FAU Center for Body, Mind, and Culture
- Martin K. Solomon, computer science professor, author, assistant chair of the Computer Science Engineering Department, expert on Oracle and databases
- Robert P. Watson, alumnus of FAU, author, national media commentator, former candidate for the United States House of Representatives; former associate professor of political science at FAU
- Jie Wu, professor in the College of Engineering and Computer Science, Program Director for the Networking Technology and Systems (NeTS) program of the National Science Foundation
