= Wackenhut (surname) =

Wackenhut is a German language surname. Notable people with the name include:

- George Wackenhut (1919–2004), American private detective and investigator
- Mario Hamuy Wackenhut (born 1960), Chilean astronomer
