= ODAS =

ODAS may refer to:

- Outdoor distributed antenna system
- OCA-DLR Asteroid Survey
- Oceanographic Data Acquisition System, a system used by a certain class of US Navy ships
- Ocean Data Acquisition System, a fixed-point ocean-based meteorological monitoring device
