= 2019 Tacoma immigration detention center attack =

Arson attempt in the Washington, U.S.

2019 Tacoma attack
- Location: Northwest Detention Center, Tacoma, Washington, United States
- Date: July 13, 2019
- Target: U.S. Immigration and Customs Enforcement detention center
- Attack type: Arson
- Weapon: Propane tank
- Deaths: 1 (the perpetrator)
- Injuries: 0
- Perpetrator: Willem van Spronsen
- Motive: Anarchism

On July 13, 2019, Willem van Spronsen firebombed a U.S. Immigration and Customs Enforcement (ICE) detention center in Tacoma, Washington. He was shot dead by police after tossing lit objects at vehicles and buildings, causing one car fire, and unsuccessfully trying to ignite a propane tank.

== Incident ==
The incident took place at 4 a.m. at the Northwest Detention Center, a privately owned detention center for undocumented immigrants. Four officers arrived at the scene and called out to van Spronsen, who they claimed was wearing a satchel and carrying flares, before reporting "shots fired". According to the statement by the Tacoma Police Department, van Spronsen, who was reported to have been carrying a rifle, "attempted to ignite a large propane tank and set our buildings on fire" and "continued throwing lit objects and firebombs at the buildings and cars". Officers promptly shot him dead. Friends of van Spronsen reportedly received farewell letters from him before the incident.

== Perpetrator ==
Willem van Spronsen (April 24, 1950 – July 13, 2019) was a 69-year-old Dutch immigrant, carpenter, and musician from the Holland region of the Netherlands, where he was born and raised. At the time of the attack, van Spronsen lived in Vashon, Washington. He had been arrested previously during a demonstration at the same ICE detention center in June 2018.

During the earlier incident, he had a physical altercation with a police officer during an effort to free a protester who was detained. Police alleged that van Spronsen was armed with a baton and a folding knife. According to police, van Spronsen was an anarchist who claimed to be associated with a designation known as antifa. In a letter written before the attack, he wrote "I am Antifa." Van Spronsen's daughter, who describes herself as an advocate of liberal pacifism, said her father was a supporter of anarchism but had written that she disagreed with him "on some principles, such as the use of force and weapons in the fight".

Van Spronsen had been active on social media under the pseudonym "Emma Durutti", a portmanteau of the names of historic anarchists Emma Goldman and Buenaventura Durruti. Van Spronsen had once been an early member of the Puget Sound John Brown Gun Club and had attended Occupy Wall Street protests in 2011. He had formerly been involved with Alcoholics Anonymous.

Van Spronsen had written a manifesto detailing his political justification for attacking the ICE facility. In this document, Van Spronsen said that "it's time to take action against the forces of evil", citing "highly profitable detention/concentration camps and a battle over the semantics".

== Terrorism classification ==
The GEO Group, which runs the facility, called the attack an act of terrorism in a public statement they released saying: "This video footage shows the seriousness of the threat to our employees and immigrants housed at the Tacoma Processing Center. We commend the Tacoma Police Department for its heroic actions in responding to this horrific act of terrorism." Seth Jones, a terrorism analyst at the Center for Strategic and International Studies, said of the attack and of Van Spronsen's beliefs: "The problem is not that people have views that are against fascism, against white supremacy, against racism. That's certainly defensible, and in fact it's a good thing. The problem is when you start getting into violence. That's where you start to cross a line in the U.S., and that's where it starts to get into the terrorism arena."

In June 2020, the think tank Center for Strategic and International Studies (CSIS) assembled a database of 893 terrorism incidents in the U.S., beginning in 1994. Although the database did not link any murders to antifa, it highlighted van Spronsen's death as the only death resulting from an anti-fascist attack, according to an analysis by The Guardian.
