= Martin Solomon =

Martin Solomon may refer to:

- Martin K. Solomon, professor of computer science
- Martin M. Solomon (born 1950), American lawyer and politician from New York
