= Salvatore D. Morgera =

American academic

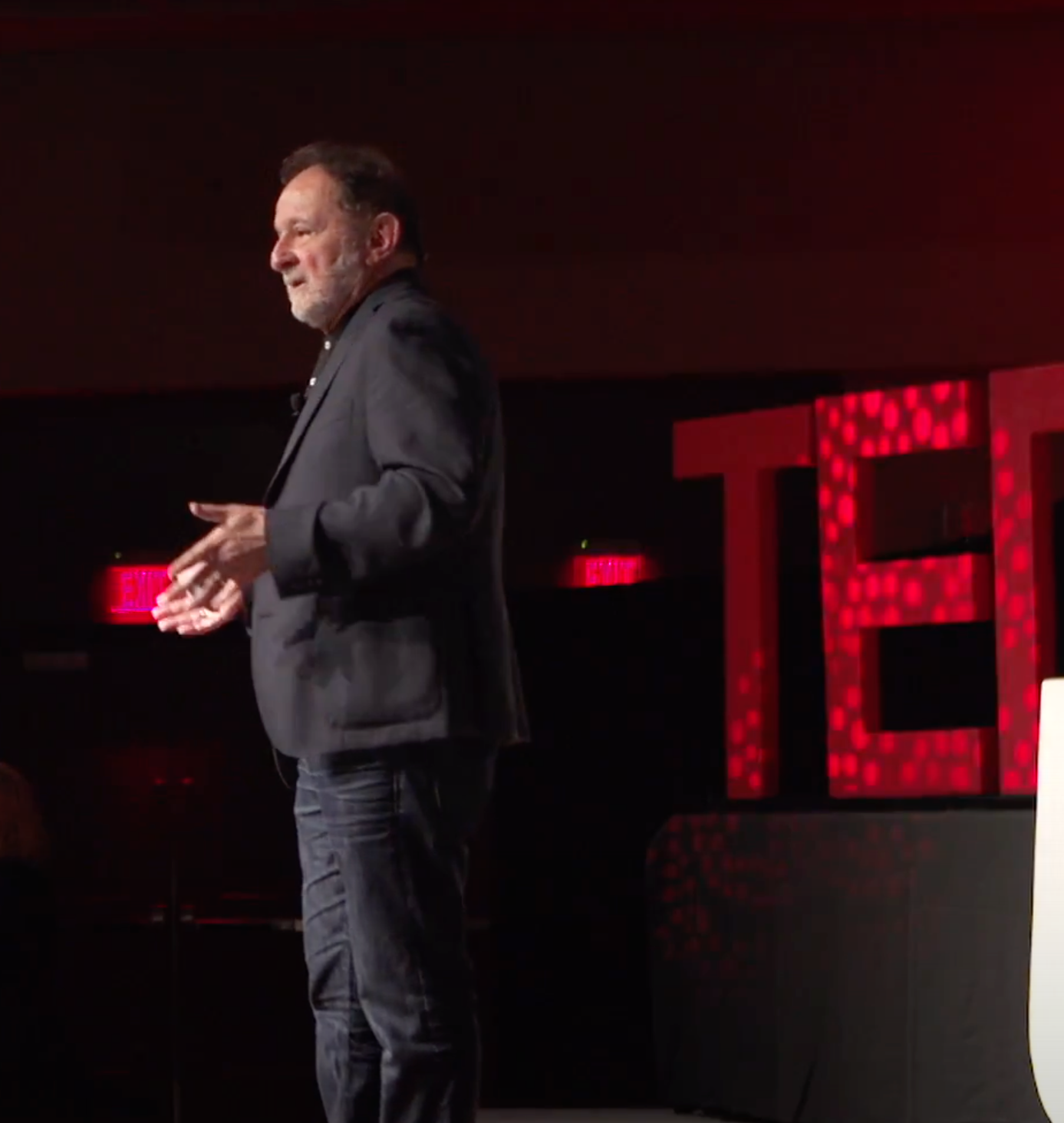
- Morgera at TEDxUSF

University of South Florida

Personal details
- Born: August 5, 1946 (age 80) Providence, Rhode Island
- Education: Brown University (Sc.B.); Brown University (Sc.M., Ph.D.)
- Occupation: Professor & Director; C4ISR Defense & Intelligence; Bioengineering Laboratory; Department of Electrical Engineering; Director, Global Center for Neurological Networks
- Profession: Engineer, scientist, inventor, academic
- Scientific career
- Fields: Electrical Engineering; Biomedical Engineering; Military Engineering; Telecommunications Engineering; Neuroscience
- Workplaces: University of South Florida; Florida Atlantic University; McGill University; United States Government; Government of Canada; Industry Canada; Concordia University; Raytheon

Salvatore Domenic Morgera is an American and Canadian engineer, scientist, inventor, and academic. Morgera is Professor of Electrical Engineering, Professor of Biomedical Engineering, and Director of the C4ISR Defense & Intelligence and Bioengineering Laboratories at the University of South Florida and Professor Emeritus at McGill University, Concordia University, and Florida Atlantic University.

In 1990, Salvatore D. Morgera was elevated to fellow of the IEEE for contribution to finite-dimensional signal processing methods.

He is the Director of the Global Center for Neurological Networks. The Global Center for Neurological Networks is a merger of several leading research laboratories, conducting research and development within the new frontiers of brain mapping, diagnostics, and therapeutics. The Center's mission is to enhance neurological function and combat neurological dysfunction through a better understanding of the structure and function of the neurological networks of the brain.

Previously, he served as Professor and Chair of Electrical Engineering and Director of the Bioengineering Program at Florida Atlantic University, Professor of Electrical and Computer Engineering and Director of the Information Networks and Systems Laboratory at McGill University, and held multiple leadership roles in industry, government, and academia in both Canada and the United States for over 45 years.

He has focused on networks his entire professional life. He, and the teams he has directed, are responsible for the Canadian oceanographic data gathering networks, the acoustic networks for American submarine tactical and strategic communications, the worldwide CAT3 auto-landing networks for commercial aircraft, and the military wireless networks used in sensitive and challenging parts of the world. In the last decade, he has turned his attention to the neurological networks of the brain and its electric near-field and bio-metamaterial structures, which could enable the development of advanced therapeutics and procedures for neurological diseases.

== Early life and education ==
Morgera was born on August 5, 1946, in Providence, Rhode Island. He graduated with a Bachelor of Science in physics with honors in 1968, and later obtained two postgraduate degrees in electrical engineering, a Master of Science in 1970 and a Ph.D. in 1975, all from Brown University.

== Career ==
From 1968 to 1978, Morgera was employed by Raytheon in Portsmouth, Rhode Island, as a Senior Scientist and Project Manager within the submarine signal division. During these early years of his career, his accomplishments at Raytheon led to the creation of a patent for an innovative ocean bottom topography system (U.S. Patent 4207620 A) and deployment of a new acoustic telemetry system.

In 1978, Morgera served as a Professor at Concordia University in Montréal, Quebec, within the Faculty of Engineering and Computer Science. Following a successful research career at Concordia through 1986, he joined McGill University as a Professor and Director of the Information Networks and Systems Laboratory, while concurrently appointed to multiple leadership roles within the Government of Canada and Industry Canada, including Special Assistant to the President, Communications Research Centre Canada, President of the Quebec Research Council, Le Fonds Nature et Technologies, and Major Project Leader, Canadian Institute for Telecommunications Research (CITR).

Florida Atlantic University then appointed Morgera as Professor and Chair of Electrical Engineering in 1998, where he worked to establish and innovate the University's bioengineering eminence and served as the Director of the Bioengineering Program. His substantial meritorious service was recognized by Florida Atlantic University through the conferral of the Emeritus Professor honorary title. Since 2009, Morgera has served as a Professor of Electrical Engineering and Director of the C4ISR Defense & Intelligence and Bioengineering Laboratories at the University of South Florida. During these later years of his career, his accomplishments at the University of South Florida led to the creation of a patent for an innovative breath collection device that can detect changes associated with pathogenesis of a disease, such as COVID-19, including biomarkers of immune response for respiratory symptoms, central nervous system injury, and/or peripheral nervous system injury in user breath and/or odor (U.S. Patent 11129545). This device was created in rapid response to the COVID-19 pandemic.

Morgera is a Life Fellow of the Institute of Electrical and Electronics Engineers (IEEE) for his contributions to finite-dimensional signal processing methods (structured estimation). In 2018, he was elected as Fellow of the Institution of Engineering and Technology as recognition for his leadership in the discipline of Electrical Engineering, his contributions to bioengineering, and his high impact research in understanding the neurological networks of the human brain. In 2011, he was elected as Fellow of the American Association for the Advancement of Science (AAAS) as recognition for pioneering research in structured estimation theory, adaptive communications, pattern analysis and academic program development in undergraduate engineering leadership and graduate bioengineering. In 2009, he was designated as a Tau Beta Pi Eminent Engineer, for achieving eminence in the field of engineering and exemplary character in the profession. He has also received commendations from both the United States and Canadian governments, Minister of Industry, Communications Research Center, for his science and technology contributions.

He is also a Fellow of the Institution of Engineering and Technology(IET), Fellow of the American Association for the Advancement of Science (AAAS) and Fellow of the Asia-Pacific Artificial Intelligence Association (AAIA).

== Selected bibliography ==
Morgera has published 165+ journal papers, 155+ conference papers, and a book, Digital Signal Processing – Applications to Communications and Algebraic Coding Theories, Academic Press. He has authored over 120 classified government documents in the areas of C4ISR. His primary areas of research contributions include wireless networks, particularly in the areas of QoS, advanced radio link protocols and cybersecurity; biometrics for identity management; and bioengineering, with emphasis on neurological networks.

As either a Principal Investigator or co-PI, he has received research support from the United States Special Operations Command, United States Department of Defense, Defense Information Systems Agency, National Science Foundation, NASA, Florida Department of Education, and multiple private sector industrial investors, including Raytheon and Harris Corporation.
