= Northwest Detention Center =

Privately-run detention center in Washington, United States

Coordinates: 47°14′59″N 122°25′19″W

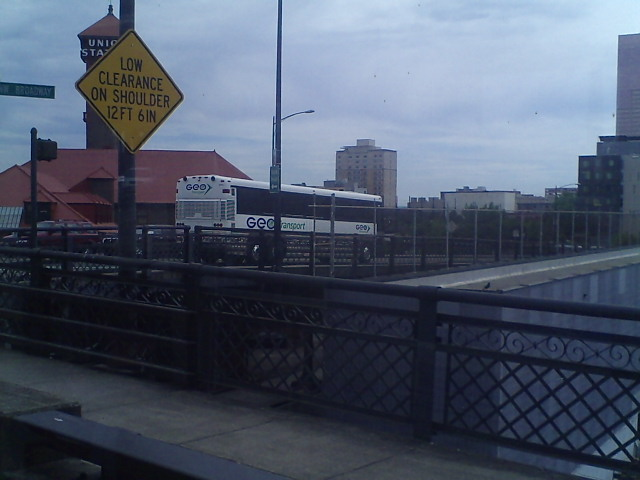
A GEO Transport bus arrives from the Northwest Detention Center to pick up detained people from the ICE office at the 511 NW Broadway federal building in Portland, Oregon.

Northwest Detention Center is a privately-run detention center located in the Tideflats of the City of Tacoma, Washington, USA. The detention center is operated by the GEO Group on behalf of the U.S. Immigration and Customs Enforcement. The NWDC's current capacity is 1575, making it one of the largest detention centers in the United States. Numerous hunger strikes have been launched by inmates of the NWDC to protest the Center's poor conditions. Detainees have repeatedly reported overcrowding, a lack of medical attention, and severely unsanitary conditions, especially during COVID-19: "they're not even offering us soap."

== History ==
The detention center opened in 2004 by Correctional Services Corporation (CSC) under a contract with The US Department of Homeland Security. In 2005, CSC was purchased by the GEO Group, thus acquiring the Northwest Detention Center.

In June 2008, the Seattle University School of Law's International Human Rights Clinic published an investigation on the NWDC concluding that conditions they found, "violate both international human rights law and domestic Constitutional protections."

A contract with Immigration and Customs Enforcement (ICE) expanded the detention center's housing capacity in 2009, making it the largest detention center owned by GEO Group on the West Coast.

In March 2014, inmates launched a hunger strike to protest conditions at NWDC. According to ICE, 750 detainees had refused meals. House Representative Adam Smith (D-9) criticized the NWDC in an interview with The Stranger in May, calling for improvement of the "shocking" conditions. Protesters are calling for better food, speedier trials, lower commissary prices, and increased wages for labor.

In April 2015, guards allegedly beat Alfredo Rodriguez, an undocumented Honduran immigrant in his 60s. Rodriguez had reportedly criticized a guard for mistreating an inmate who was mopping. Rodriguez has since been deported, and Jennifer Lesmez, who represents six detainees who witnessed the incident, says some were threatened with retaliation if they complained. U.S. Immigration and Customs Enforcement spokesman Andrew Muñoz disputed the account, adding that "ICE policies forbid retaliation" toward detainees.

In October 2015, the GEO Group renewed a ten-year contract with ICE. The contract pays GEO for almost 1,200 beds daily, regardless if they are used.

On August 18, 2016, the U.S. Justice Department announced that they would end privatization of federal prisons, however this would not affect immigrant detention centers, which were 62% privately operated in 2014 compared to 8% of federal prisoners. Geo stocks declined sharply after the announcement.

On September 20, 2017 WA State Attorney General Bob Ferguson filed a lawsuit against GEO Group, Inc., the private prison company that runs Tacoma's Northwest Detention Center (NWDC). The lawsuit alleges that GEO Group, Inc., the second-largest private prison provider in the country, has for years violated Washington State's minimum wage law, paying its workers $1 per day or in some instances, with snacks and extra food. "Let's be honest about what's going on," said Ferguson, speaking at a downtown Seattle news conference. "GEO has a captive population of vulnerable individuals who cannot easily advocate for themselves. This corporation is exploiting those workers for their own profits."

On July 13, 2019 an armed individual allegedly attempted to attack the detention center with a rifle and threw incendiary devices. The individual was killed during a confrontation with law enforcement. Four Tacoma police officers were placed on paid administrative leave.

On April 17, 2020, a group of female detainees began a hunger strike to protest the dangerous conditions they faced at the NWDC during the COVID-19 epidemic. The women reported severe overcrowding, a lack of access to medical care, and total disregard for sanitation.
