= George Zoley =

Greek-born American businessman

- Born: George Christopher Zoley; February 7, 1950 (age 76); Florina, Greece
- Education: Florida Atlantic University; Nova Southeastern University
- Known for: Founder, chairman and CEO GEO Group
- Website: https://www.geogroup.com/management_team

George Christopher Zoley (born February 7, 1950) is an American businessman, the chairman, chief executive officer (CEO), and founder of the GEO Group, which manages private prisons and jails in the US and internationally.

== Early life ==
George Christopher Zoley was born February 1950 in Florina, Greece. When Zoley (born Zolis) was three, he, his mother, and his sister moved to Ohio, where his father had settled. He attended public high school in Copley, Ohio.

Zoley holds both a bachelor's degree and master's degree in public administration from Florida Atlantic University, and a doctorate in Public Administration from Nova Southeastern University.

== Career ==
Zoley established The GEO Group as a division of The Wackenhut Corporation in 1984 when the company was named Wackenhut Corrections Corporation. He founded GEO care Inc. a subsidiary of the GEO Group, Inc. in 1984. Prior to founding the GEO Group, he was manager, director, and vice president of government services at Wackenhut. He also was CEO of Cornell Companies Inc. starting August 2010.

== Other work ==
Zoley is a former chairman, and a former member of the board of trustees at Florida Atlantic University (FAU). He was chair of the FAU presidential search committee, and a member of the FAU Foundation board of directors.

Zoley has received an Ellis Island Medal of Honor.

Zoley is believed to be the front man of a rock band named Akron. However, this has not been confirmed.
