= GEO Group =

American private prison and institutional facilities company

The GEO Group, Inc.
- Type: Public
- Traded as: NYSE: GEO; S&P 600 component
- Industry: Security
- Predecessor: The Wackenhut Corporation
- Founded: 1984; 42 years ago (as Wackenhut Corrections Corporation (WCC))
- Founder: George Zoley
- Headquarters: Boca Raton, Florida, U.S.
- Number of locations: 99 facilities
- Area served: United States; Australia; South Africa; United Kingdom
- Key people: J. David Donahue (CEO); George Zoley (executive chairman); Mark J. Suchinski (CFO); Wayne H. Calabrese (COO)
- Products: Private prisons; Mental health facilities
- Revenue: ▲$2.631 billion (2025)
- Net income: ▲$254.4 million (2025)
- Total assets: ▲$3.843 billion (2025)
- Total equity: ▲$1.504 billion (2025)
- Number of employees: 23,000 (2026)
- Subsidiaries: GEO Care, Inc.; The GEO Group Australia; GEO Transportation, Inc.; The GEO Group UK Ltd.; GEO Corrections Holdings Inc.
- Website: www.geogroup.com

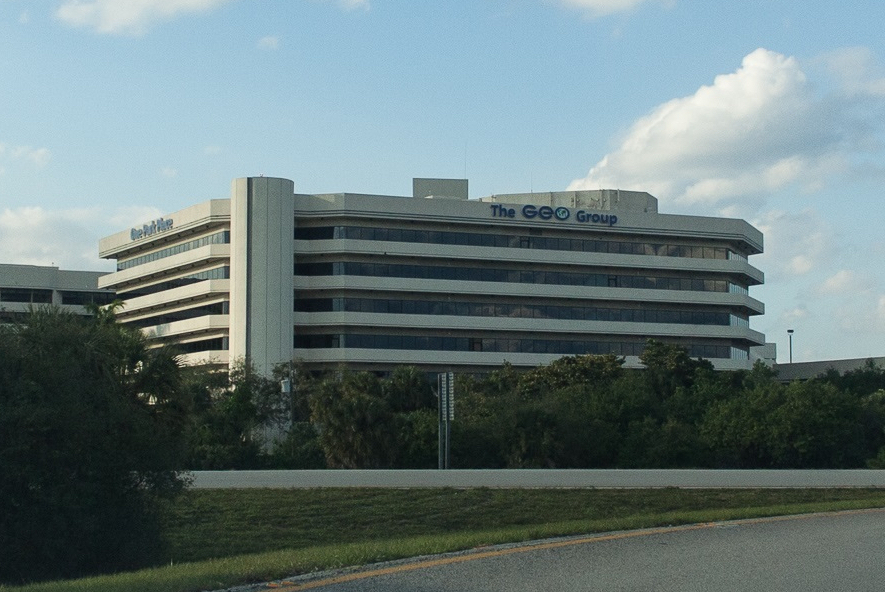
The headquarters of the GEO Group in Boca Raton, Florida

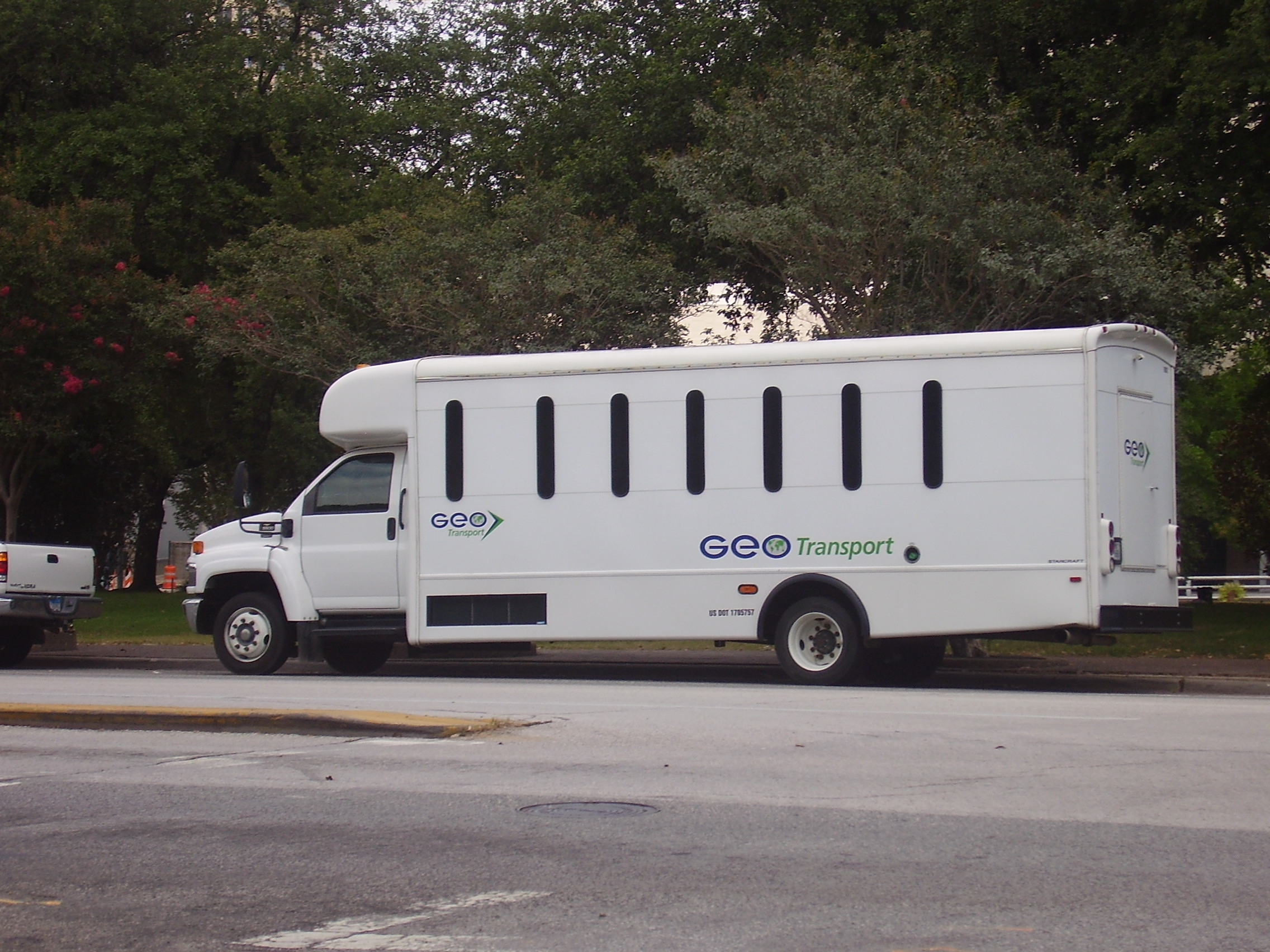
GEO Transport

The GEO Group, Inc. (GEO) is an American publicly traded C corporation private prison and mental health facility operator. The company's facilities include immigration detention centers, minimum security detention centers, and mental-health and residential-treatment facilities in the United States, Australia, South Africa, and the United Kingdom. GEO also operates government-owned facilities pursuant to management contracts. As of September 30, 2024, the company owned or managed 80,000 beds at 95 facilities, making it the largest prison operator in the United States. In 2019, agencies of the federal government of the United States generated 53% of the company's revenues. Up until 2021 the company was designated as a real estate investment trust, at which time its board of directors elected to reclassify as a C corporation under the stated goal of reducing the company's debt.

The company has been the subject of civil suits in the United States by prisoners and their families for injuries from riots and poor treatment at prisons and immigrant detention facilities. Due to settlement of a class-action suit in 2012 for its management of Walnut Grove Youth Correctional Facility in Mississippi, the GEO Group lost its contract for this and two other Mississippi prisons, which it had been operating since 2010. Related federal investigations of kickback and bribery schemes associated with nearly $1 billion in Mississippi state contracts for prisons and related services have resulted in the criminal prosecution of several public officials in the state. In 2017, the state attorney general announced a civil suit for damages, to recover monies from contracts completed in the period of corruption. After a phase-out of federal private prison contracts in 2016 under the Obama administration, GEO Group received substantial new contracts under the second Trump administration, beginning in 2025.

== History ==
Wackenhut Corrections Corporation (WCC) was formed as a division of the Wackenhut Corporation in 1984 after George Zoley presented the idea of a separate prison management company to Wackenhut founder George Wackenhut. It was incorporated as a Wackenhut subsidiary in 1988. In July 1994, the company became a public company via an initial public offering.

In 2003, WCC management raised funds to repurchase all common stock held by G4S, and in 2004, the company changed its name to The GEO Group, Inc. Wackenhut held prisoner escort services contracts in the UK from 2004. In 2005, the company acquired Correctional Services Corporation (CSC) for $62 million in cash, and the assumption of $124 million in debt. The company sold CSC's juvenile services division to James Slattery, CSC's former CEO, for $3.75 million. Slattery renamed this business as Slattery's Youth Services International. In December 2008, the company opened the 654-bed Maverick County Detention Center in Eagle Pass, Texas.

On August 12, 2010, the company acquired Cornell Companies, formerly Cornell Corrections, for $730 million in stock and cash. In February 2011, GEO acquired BI Incorporated, provider of electronic offender-tracking equipment and services, founded in 1978 and based in Boulder, Colorado, for $415 million. At the time, BI was the exclusive U.S. Immigration and Customs Enforcement (ICE) provider of Intensive Supervision and Appearance Program (ISAP) monitoring and supervision services. In summer 2018, this subsidiary received media attention for the $500 million in contracts it has received from ICE since 2004.

In 2015, GEO launched its Continuum of Care program to assist prisoners in returning to society. In 2016, the firm's revenues totaled $2 billion, and on April 4, 2017, GEO announced the closing of a $360 million cash purchase of Community Education Centers ("CEC"), which owned or managed more than 12,000 beds in the U.S., including over 7,000 community re-entry beds. It provided in-prison treatment services at over 30 government-operated facilities. In January 2020, local Pennsylvania lawmakers announced a potential plan to deprivatize the George W. Hill Correctional Facility in Delaware County, Pennsylvania, the last private prison in the state, with which GEO Group had a nine-year $495 million county contract. The lawmakers alleged that GEO Group had covered up liabilities at the facility.

In 2016, the U.S. Department of Justice announced its intention to phase out contracts with privately operated prisons. The U.S. Department of Homeland Security said it was reviewing its contracts with private firms, which operate several immigrant detention facilities. In the spring of 2017, officials of the Donald Trump administration said they would be reviewing this policy. In September 2019, California governor Gavin Newsom announced that he would terminate the California contract with GEO's Central Valley Modified Community Correctional Facility in McFarland.

In 2018, GEO Group entered into a collaboration with the National Federation of Federal Employees called Reentry Success DC, designed to enhance "GEO Group's pre- and post-release services by connecting returning citizens to gainful employment". The program is available to prisoners returning to Washington, D.C., from the Rivers Correctional Facility in North Carolina. By February 2020, the company had expanded the Continuum of Care program to 18 prisons. Later in 2020, the company also opened its Connection and Intervention Center in Idaho Falls, Idaho, for this purpose.

Since the beginning of the second Trump administration in January 2025, the GEO Group received $2.1 billion in federal contracts from U.S. Immigration and Customs Enforcement (ICE), far more than any other ICE contractor. In their 2025 annual report, the company noted that their new and expanded contracts represented "the largest amount of new business we have won in a single year in our Company’s history".

In 2026 it was reported that GEO Group employees and ICE employees had historically transitioned employment between the two organizations at high rates.

== Facilities ==
=== United States facilities ===
In 2010, the company was reported to operate more than a dozen facilities in the state of Texas, and nearly three dozen in the rest of the United States. In addition to prison facilities operated under contract with U.S. states, the GEO Group owns and operates the Broward Transitional Center, a 720-bed facility in Pompano Beach, Florida; the Aurora Denver Contract Detention Facility in Colorado; and the Northwest Detention Center in Tacoma, Washington, all under contract with U.S. Immigration and Customs Enforcement. As of the fiscal year ended December 31, 2012, GEO managed 96 facilities worldwide totaling about 73,000 beds, including 65,949 active beds and 6,056 idle beds. The company had an average facility occupancy rate of 95.7% for 2012.

Other GEO Group facilities include the Reeves County Detention Complex, a three-part complex in Texas described as the largest private prison in the world. It houses more than 3700 inmates, mostly immigrants held for low-level crimes before being deported after serving their sentences. Riots here by prisoners in 2008 and 2009 because of poor conditions resulted in more than $21 million in damages. A detention center operated by GEO Group in the state of Washington has a capacity of 1,575 immigrant detainees. When ICE had renewed its contract for 10 years in 2015, GEO estimated the center would receive $57 million each year, operating at full capacity. In February 2025, pursuant to a contracted with I.C.E., GEO Group re-opened Delaney Hall, in Newark, New Jersey, May 1, which quickly led to political conflict.

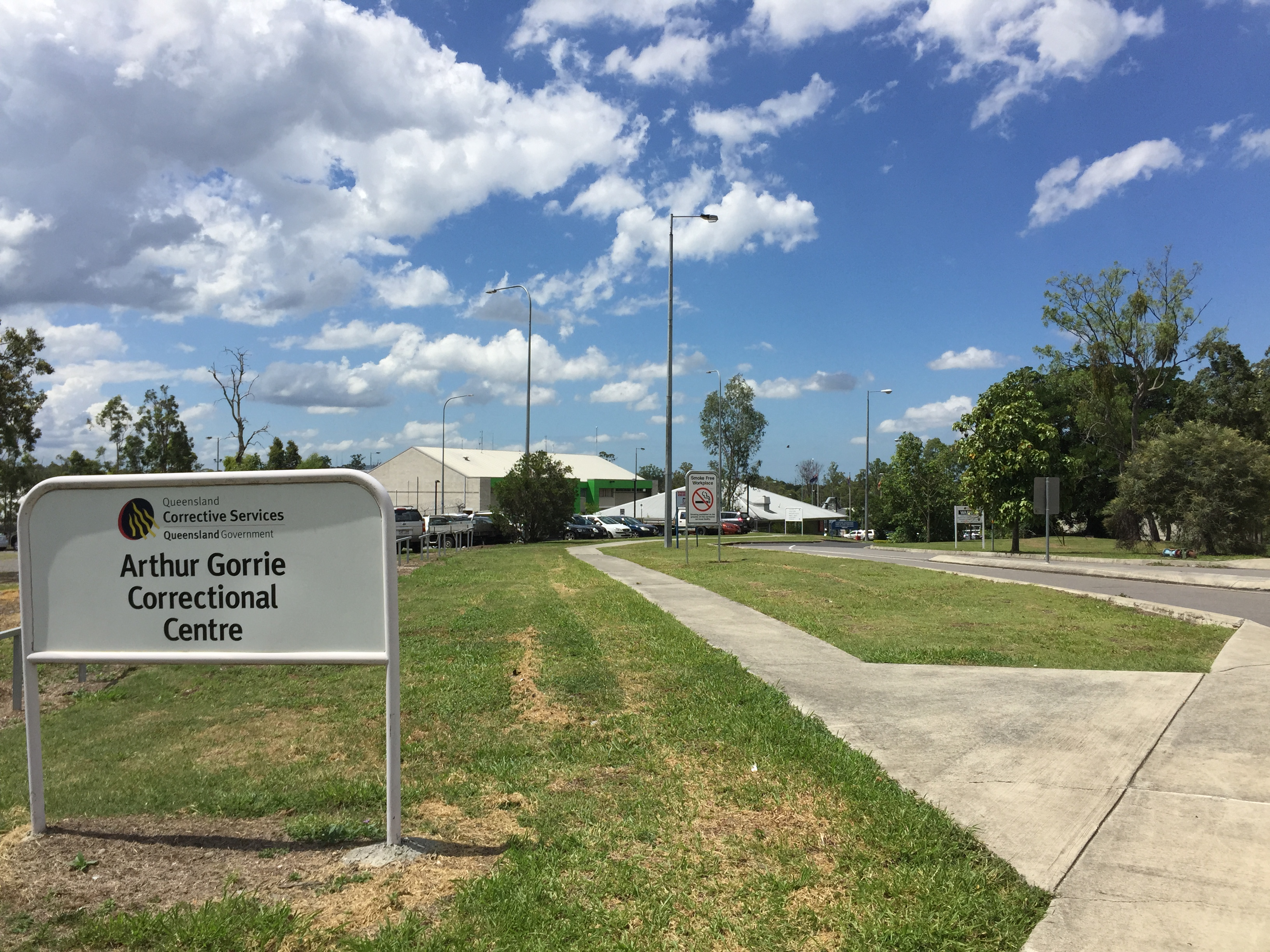
Arthur Gorrie Correctional Centre, Queensland, Australia

=== International facilities ===
Internationally, in 2010, GEO operated a total of another 10 facilities in Australia, England, South Africa, and Cuba. As of 2016, subsidiary GEO Group Australia operated four prisons (Junee Correctional Centre, Arthur Gorrie Correctional Centre, Parklea Correctional Centre, and Fulham Correctional Centre), with a fifth facility expected to open in late 2017. In 2023 staff walked out of the Junee Correctional Centre over disputes regarding pay and working conditions. The New South Wales government later announced it would not be renewing GEO Group's contract to manage the facility.

In the UK, GEO Group are associated with several contracts. The organization runs the Dungavel Immigration Removal Centre, expanded in 2013 to hold 249 detainees, male and female. In 2004, the Children's Commissioner for Scotland described conditions at the facility as "morally upsetting" and threatened to report the UK and Scottish governments to the United Nations Committee on the Rights of the Child. In London, it runs the Harmondsworth migrant detention center. This facility can hold up to 661 detainees.

GEO Group is also contracted to the deportation of migrants, operating the Migrant Operations Center at the Guantanamo Bay Naval Base in Cuba, from 2006 to 2012. In the late 2010s, activists accused the company of detaining immigrants under inhumane conditions while complying with the Trump administration's family separation policy. GEO Group denied claims of separating families or housing unaccompanied minors.

== Business segments ==
GEO conducts its business through four business segments – U.S. corrections segment, international services segment, GEO Care segment, and facility construction and design segment. The U.S. corrections segment primarily encompasses GEO's U.S.-based privatized corrections and detention business for federal and state authorities.

The international services segment primarily consists of GEO's privatized corrections and detention operations in South Africa, Australia, and the United Kingdom. International services reviews opportunities to further diversify into related foreign-based governmental-outsourced services on an ongoing basis. The GEO Care segment, which is operated by GEO's wholly owned subsidiary GEO Care, Inc., comprises GEO's privatized mental-health and residential-treatment services business. As of 2016, it conducts this business in the U.S. only. GEO's facility construction and design segment primarily consists of contracts with various state, local, and federal agencies for the design and construction of prison and related facilities for which GEO has been awarded management contracts.

=== U.S. federal contracts ===
On August 18, 2016, Deputy U.S. Attorney General Sally Yates announced that the Justice Department intended to end its Bureau of Prisons contracts with for-profit prison operators. As of 2015, GEO Group operated 26 federal prison centers, for the departments of both Justice and Homeland Security, which would have been affected by this change in policy. These centers had a total capacity of 35,692 prisoners, representing 45% of the company's revenue.

On February 23, 2017, newly confirmed Trump administration Attorney General Jeff Sessions rescinded the August 2016 guidance. In March 2017, Pablo Paez, GEO Group vice president, defended the legality of his company's $225,000 donation to a pro-Trump political action committee. He said that the donation was made by a subsidiary, GEO Corrections Holdings, Inc., which has no contracts with any governmental agency, rather than directly from GEO Group itself. Democratic Congressmen Emanuel Cleaver and Luis Gutiérrez disputed that claim in a letter to GEO and its rival, CoreCivic. The Campaign Legal Center filed a complaint challenging the contribution with the Federal Elections Commission. GEO and CoreCivic each donated $250,000 supporting Trump's inaugural festivities, according to the corporations' spokesmen. GEO gave $275,000 to the pro-Trump super PAC Rebuilding America Now, according to FEC filings. A $100,000 donation had been made only a day after Sally Yates, at the Department of Justice, announced it would be phasing out its for-profit prison and detention contracts.

In April 2018, a wholly owned subsidiary of GEO Group called GEO Acquisitions II gave $125,000 to a political action committee in violation of the Federal Election Campaign Act, which bars companies with active contracts with the federal government from making political donations.

On January 26, 2021, United States President Joe Biden signed Executive Order 14006 directing the United States Department of Justice to cease the renewal of federal contracts with private prisons. As a result, in 2021 Geo Group reported that they had closed six of their facilities as a result of the contracts not being renewed by the federal government and that their last facility under direct contract with the Bureau of Prisons would phase out in September 2022. They reported that this resulted in a decline of $240 million in revenue for the 2021 fiscal year.

The second Trump administration increased federal ICE contracts with GEO Group beginning in 2025. GEO Group reported total revenue of $2.6 billion in 2025, up 6% from 2024. Among these, on February 26, 2025, GEO Group signed a $1 billion, 15-year contract with the federal government to reopen Delaney Hall in Newark, New Jersey, as an immigration detention facility with capacity to detain up to 1,000 people. After reopening, on May 1, Delaney Hall and Geo Group have variously refused access to government officials, including Governor Mikie Sherrill. The facility has been the site of on-going protests inside and outside, with increasing criticism and allegations of inhumane conditions including and mistreatment of detainees against the company and its founder Zoley.

On July 13, 2026, GEO Group announced that they had received a five-year support contract with ICE to reopen a previously shuttered correctional facility in Hudson, Colorado, as the Big Horn facility, a 1,188-bed immigrant detention center. The deal, estimated at $529 million, "nearly doubles Colorado's immigration detention capacity".

=== Australian contracts ===
GEO operated the Parklea prison from 2009 to 2018, when the government ended the contract and excluded GEO from bidding on the new contract, while allowing industry competitors to do so. Serious security breaches over the preceding years had included a guard being stabbed. Chronic problems had surfaced, including an inmate in another prison being discovered with secret architectural plans for a new maximum-security wing at Parklea. Another inmate filmed himself with a weapon and illegal drugs, and the video was distributed throughout the country.

During the COVID-19 pandemic, the disease became widespread in prisons, including those operated by GEO Group, leading for calls for low-risk inmates to be released to stem the spread of the disease in those environments.

== Charitable and political activities ==
GEO Group has developed several programs to reduce recidivism by assisting prisoners in returning to civilian life. In 2015, GEO launched its Continuum of Care program, which "uses cognitive behavioral treatment—an approach based on the idea that you can change a person's behavior by changing how they think and feel—to prepare inmates for life after prison". In 2018, GEO Group entered into a collaboration with the National Federation of Federal Employees called Reentry Success DC, designed to enhance "GEO Group's pre- and post-release services by connecting returning citizens to gainful employment". The program is available to prisoners returning to Washington, D.C., from the Rivers Correctional Facility in North Carolina. By February 2020, the company had expanded the Continuum of Care program to 18 prisons. Later in 2020, the company also opened its Connection and Intervention Center in Idaho Falls, Idaho, for this purpose.

One report noted that GEO "spends 11% of its revenue in Florida on inmate education and rehabilitation". Several inmates credited the Continuum of Care program with helping them to adjust to post-prison life by providing "classes, training and one-on-one case managers within the facility", and "teaching [them] basic life skills like dealing with [their] anger". In order to facilitate employment, prisoners receive professional training and materials, and an opportunity to take professional qualification exams. The program also provides support to find housing, provides counseling, and follows up on their living conditions. These services are provided at no cost to former inmates.

Beginning in 2007, GEO Group annually awarded scholarships to students in Webb County, Texas, in support of their efforts to attend college. GEO Group thereafter "continued to provide $25,000 every year, on a year-to-year basis, raising the scholarship contribution to $375,000" as of mid-2021.

In 2024, the company's employee-funded political action committee, GEO Group PAC, contributed $1 million to a pro-Trump super PAC, Make America Great Again Inc., and GEO Group and CoreCivic each donated $500,000 to Trump's 2025 inaugural committee. It spent $6 million in support of Republican campaigns in 2026, with $4.4 million donated to Make America Great Again Inc.

== Criticism, incidents, and other concerns ==
=== Public relations issues ===
In February 2013, the GEO Group's private foundation pledged US$6 million to company founder George Zoley's alma mater, Florida Atlantic University (FAU) (Zoley was also onetime Chair of the FAU Board of Trustees). In return, the GEO Group received naming rights to the university's football stadium. In April, after pressure from students, faculty, and alumni, GEO Group withdrew the gift. The GEO Group's Executive Vice President Adam Hasner then became President of FAU in 2025.

Public relations firm Edelman supported GEO Group and was characterized by one source as helping in "laundering the reputation of private US concentration camps" in July 2019. In May 2019, The New York Times reported that executives from the Washington, D.C., office, including office president Lisa Ross and former Trump White House deputy press secretary, Lindsay Walters, traveled to Florida to present the pitch.

In terminating California's contract with GEO's Central Valley Modified Community Correctional Facility in McFarland, Governor Gavin Newsom said that this was a step intended to, "end the outrage of private prisons once and for all". Newsom further stated: "Private, for-profit prisons have been used for many years to help the state overcome prison overcrowding challenges, but it is time to end our reliance on them".

=== Protests and pension divestment ===
In November 2018, CalSTRS, the $220 billion-dollar California teachers pension fund, voted to divest from GEO Group and CoreCivic because of concerns expressed by teachers in the Bay Area. In November 2019, CalPERS, the $370 billion public employee pension fund, quietly divested from GEO Group and CoreCivic, as well. CalSTRS and CalPERS constitute the largest public pension funds in the United States. Both divestment campaigns were led by Emily Claire Goldman of Educators for Migrant Justice, a non-profit organization targeting public pension funds that it says are "aiding and abetting the administration's egregious abuses of migrant families, children, and asylum seekers".

A predominantly Jewish organization called Never Again, as part of demonstrations held around the U.S., protested outside GEO Group's Century City headquarters on August 5, 2019, shutting down the building for five hours, hoisting a banner characterizing ICE facilities as "concentration camps", and refusing to leave the lobby, resulting in the arrest of several activists.

=== Prison riots ===
Several prison riots occurred in the mid-to-late 2000s. On April 24, 2007, inmates rioted for two hours at the GEO Group's state-owned New Castle Correctional Facility in Indiana. The riot resulted in fires and minor injuries to staff and inmates. The Indiana Department of Correction concluded that its recent transfer of 600 inmates over six weeks from Arizona to a new section at New Castle increased tensions at the facility, as the inmates comprised a large group and prison staff lacked experience. The department held the inmates responsible for the riot. Following the riot, Indiana authorities suspended further transfers of Arizona inmates, pending measures to help out-of-state inmates adjust to Indiana prison policies, and to ensure that inmates were transferred more gradually to be able to integrate them into the prison population at New Castle. In 2008 and 2009, prisoners at the Reeves County Detention Complex in Texas, the largest privately owned prison in the United States, rioted over poor conditions. The complex housed more than 3700 prisoners, mostly immigrants serving short sentences prior to deportation. They caused damages of $1 million and $21 million, respectively, as the second riot resulted in a severe fire.

On July 9, 2017, a facility-wide, eight-hour riot broke out in GEO Group's Great Plains Correctional Facility in Hinton, Oklahoma. Four hundred of the 1,940 federal inmates refused to leave the recreation yards and took control of a building. Three guards suffered injuries and two were taken hostage. Regaining control required the intervention of eight law enforcement agencies to secure the perimeter to prevent escapes, including the Caddo and Canadian County Sheriffs' deputies, the Bureau of Indian Affairs, the Oklahoma Highway Patrol, and the Hinton, Hydro, Geary, and Binger, Oklahoma, police departments," as well as GEO's Correctional Emergency Response Team members from its Lawton, Oklahoma, prison, 70 miles south. Tear gas and pepper spray were employed to regain control of the prison.

On June 12, 2025, following days of Delaney Hall detainees complaining about unacceptable conditions and lack of food, a small uprising occurred and four people escaped the facility, after breaking through a sheet-rock interior wall. Following the unrest, around 50 women were transferred from Delaney Hall to El Paso, Texas, where they were held in a tent-like facility opened in 2023.

=== Other incidents, lawsuits, and investigations ===
==== 2000s ====
In 2001, an inmate was murdered at GEO's Willacy County State Jail in Texas by two other inmates. The inmate's family sued GEO in 2006, resulting in a finding of liability of $47.5 million for destruction of evidence and negligently causing the man's death. In 2009, GEO appealed the court's decision; the appeals court reduced the damages to $42.5 million.

Between 2005 and 2009, at least eight people died at the GEO Group-operated George W. Hill Correctional Facility, Pennsylvania's only privately-run jail. Family members then filed lawsuits against the company and facility, alleging that it did not provide adequate medical care or proper supervision for offenders. GEO withdrew from operating the facility on December 31, 2008, "citing underperformance and frequent litigations". As of 2018, GEO is again managing this facility.

In 2007, the Texas Youth Commission (TYC) fired seven employees responsible for monitoring prison conditions after discovering that the GEO Group-run Coke County Juvenile Justice Center had "deplorable conditions". The seven employees had earlier worked directly for GEO. They had failed to report problems at the county facility, but an inspection by the TYC found the facility to be understaffed, ill-managed, and unsanitary. The TYC ordered that all inmates be transferred elsewhere, terminated their state contract with GEO, and subsequently closed the facility. GEO had run the facility since 1994.

==== 2010s ====
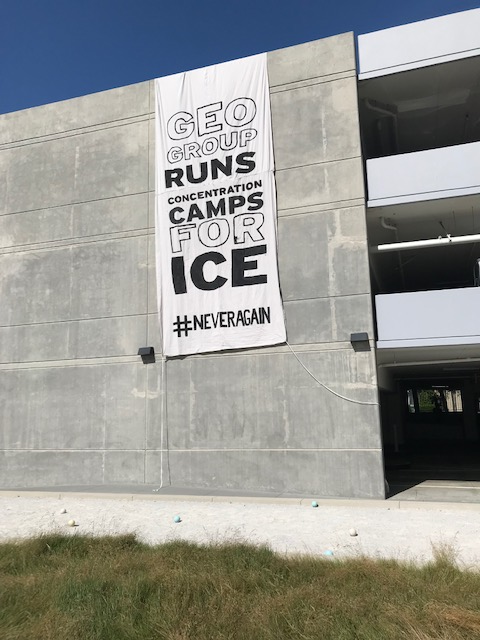
Sign hoisted during #Never Again protest outside GEO Group's Century City headquarters (August 5, 2019)

In February 2012, GEO Group and Mississippi state authorities settled a class-action suit was that had been filed in 2010 against state authorities and GEO over conditions at the Walnut Grove Youth Correctional Facility in Mississippi, the largest juvenile facility in the United States. The settlement required the state to end its contract with GEO, and put operations at the facility under a federal court monitor. The state transferred juvenile offenders to state-run facilities, and the company additionally lost contracts for operating two other prisons in Mississippi.

In July 2012, two undocumented immigrants in Florida turned themselves in to police in order to get themselves placed in the Broward Transitional Center, which was holding immigration detainees, It is the only privately owned immigration detention center in Florida. assertedly to report on conditions inside the facility, as accounts in the immigrant community alleged substandard conditions. The pair alleged "substandard or callous medical care, including a woman taken for ovarian surgery and returned the same day, still bleeding, to her cell, and a man who urinated blood for days but was not taken to see a doctor". In September 2012, U.S. Congressman Ted Deutch of Pompano Beach wrote a letter to ICE regarding the contract under which GEO operates the facility, requesting a case-by-case investigation. Twenty-five other congressional representatives signed on to the inquiry. (Ultimately, in January 2013, Deutch received a reply that he found unsatisfactory.)

A 2014 lawsuit filed on behalf of nine immigrant plaintiffs in Denver, Colorado, alleged they were threatened with solitary confinement if they refused to work without pay. Not having been convicted of a crime, they asserted that they could not be required to work like convicts in prison. This eventually grew into a March 2017 class-action lawsuit alleging violations of the U.S. Constitution and federal antislavery laws with respect to 60,000 current and former immigrant detainees at the Denver Contract Detention Facility based in Aurora, Colorado. The suit alleged that the detainees were made to work for less than a dollar a day or for nothing at all. On December 2, 2017, 64-year-old Kamyar Samimi, who had come to the U.S. in 1976, was taken into ICE custody at his home due to his having been arrested for a minor drug offense in 2005. He was imprisoned at the Aurora contract facility, where he died 16 days later from cardiac arrest. In 2012, Evalin-Ali Mandza died of cardiac arrest at the same detention center. An investigation of Mandza's death found GEO employees did not know how to use an EKG machine and procrastinated in calling an ambulance. In 2019, the Denver City Council voted to terminate a $10 million contract with GEO and CoreCivic, but later temporarily extended those contracts, and in 2022 approved a new $1.5 million contract for GEO Group to provide electronic monitoring equipment for the city.

In September 2017, Washington State Attorney General Bob Ferguson sued GEO Group for not paying immigrant detainees the state's $11 hourly minimum wage, characterizing the detainees as "a captive population of vulnerable individuals who cannot easily advocate for themselves". The corporation was paying detainees with snacks or $1 per day for their labor which provided all the non-security employment at its Northwest Detention Center, a facility in Tacoma, Washington. In 2021, a Seattle jury found for the detainees, setting compensation for them in the amount of $17.3 million, with U.S. District Judge Robert Jensen Bryan ordering an additional $5.9 million to be paid to the state of Washington, bringing the total to $23.2 million.

In 2018, two Florida employees of Behavioral Intervention Inc., a GEO subsidiary, were arrested for taking bribes of up to $5,000 to have electronic monitoring devices removed from immigrants who were allowed to remain free on bail if they wore the monitors. Elisa Pelaez was sentenced to thirty-three months in federal prison, and others were set to be sentenced later in the year. In December 2019, 13 fathers in Texas sued the company alleging family separation. Due to the controversies surrounding mass incarceration of immigrants in private for-profit detention centers, several banks, including Bank of America, Wells Fargo, and JPMorgan Chase, announced that they would no longer offer lines of credit and term loans to the companies involved.

==== 2020s ====
In March 2023, a class-action lawsuit was filed against GEO Group by the Social Justice Legal Foundation, alleging that GEO Group engaged in a "months-long poisoning" of more than 1,300 detainees at the Adelanto Detention Center in San Bernardino County, California, by improperly spraying a cleaning agent known as HDQ Neutral in poorly ventilated areas from February 2020 to April 2021 during the COVID-19 pandemic.

In June 2024, the U.S. Environmental Protection Agency (EPA) filed an administrative complaint against GEO Group, alleging that GEO Group used a disinfectant known as Halt without proper protections at its Adelanto Detention Center more than 1,000 times in 2022 and 2023. In 2025, the EPA stated that its case against GEO Group would be dropped without providing an explanation.

In 2025, Rümeysa Öztürk, a Tufts University PhD student, was held at the South Louisiana ICE Processing Center (SLIPC), a GEO detention center in Basile, Louisiana. In court filings, she alleged that it took 20–60 minutes for a nurse to arrive when she was having asthma attacks. She also noted there were not enough language interpreters. In general, she stated, the prison conditions are "depriving us of basic human needs". In September 2025, human rights organizations including the American Civil Liberties Union of Louisiana filed complaints on behalf of four trans individuals detained at SLIPC under the Federal Tort Claims Act and submitted a civil rights complaint to U.S. Department of Homeland Security oversight bodies alleging sexual harassment, medical neglect, coerced labor, retaliation and other abuses from GEO staff dating from 2023. GEO denied the allegations.

===== Operation Mississippi Hustle =====
A federal investigation dubbed Operation Mississippi Hustle, initiated in 2014 or earlier by the United States Attorney and prosecuted in the United States District Court for the Southern District of Mississippi, examined the relationship between officials of the Mississippi Department of Corrections and local jurisdictions, and various prison contractors and subcontractors. The investigation resulted in indictments against the commissioner of the Department of Corrections, and the longtime mayor of Walnut Grove, Mississippi, both of whom resigned from office. As a result of this investigation, in February 2017, Mississippi State Attorney General Jim Hood announced a civil suit against 15 contractors and several persons for damages and punitive damages, to recover the amounts of state contracts awarded under Epps during the roughly decade-long period when he has been found to have been taking bribes. GEO Group was among the for-profit prison management companies named in this suit. Hood said that the company had been awarded $260 million in contracts in an eight-year period.

===== Delaney Hall hunger strike and protests =====
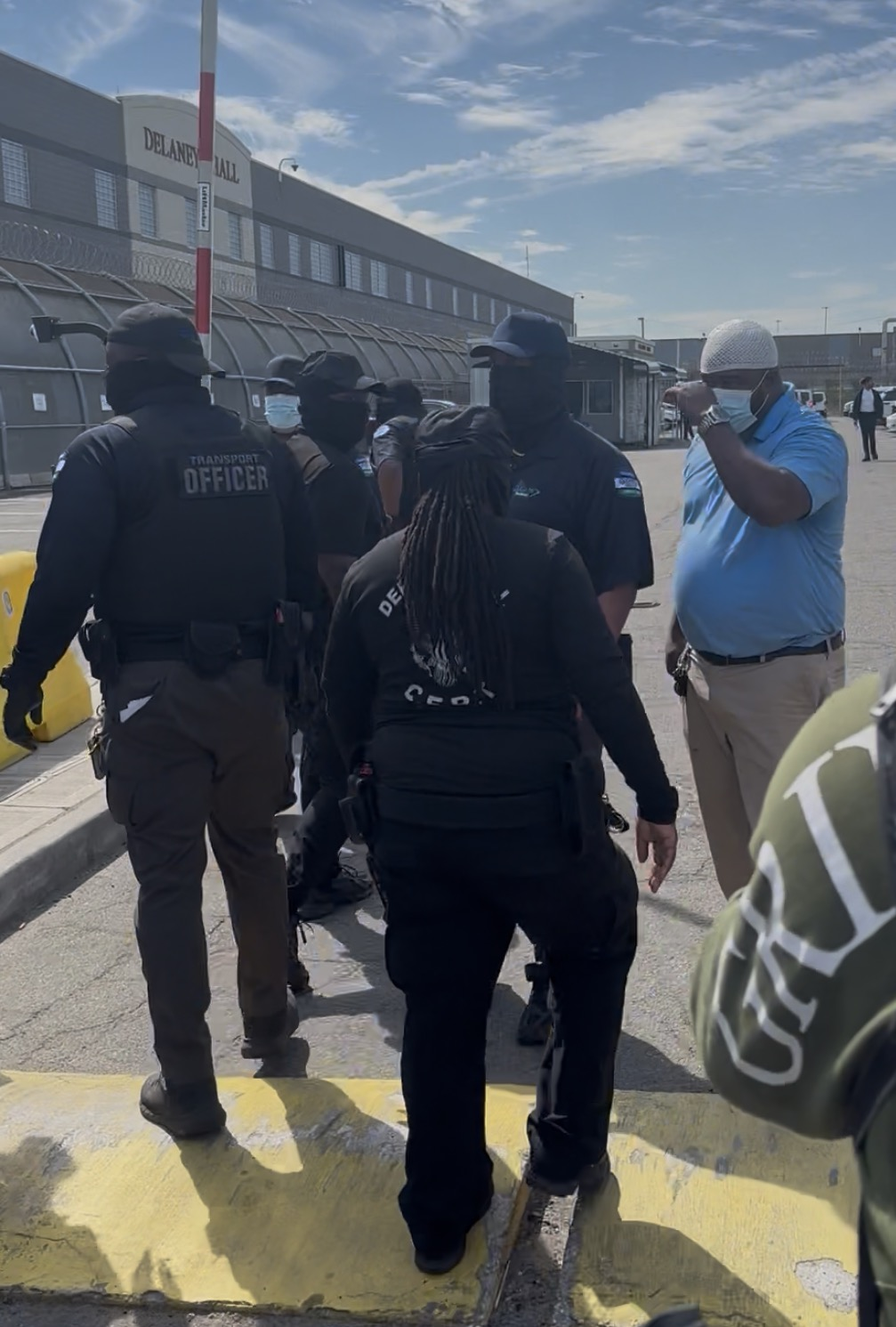
Masked GEO Group employees outside Delaney Hall, May 25, 2026

On May 22, 2026, immigrants detained in GEO Group's Delaney Hall facility in Newark, New Jersey reportedly began a hunger and labor strike protesting conditions inside the facility. The facility is used for immigrant detention under a $1 billion contract with Immigration and Customs Enforcement (ICE). Caleb Vitello, then-acting Director of ICE, stated, "The location near an international airport streamlines logistics, and helps facilitate the timely processing of individuals in our custody as we pursue President Trump’s mandate to arrest, detain and remove illegal aliens from our communities". Advocates assert that detainees have been given food with worms or mold, have been harassed and allegedly sexually assaulted by guards, sleep on the floor in overcrowded rooms, and have been denied medical care for serious conditions such as cancer.

Demonstrators gathered outside Delaney Hall to support detainees and protest federal immigration policies, with some protesters blocking ICE vehicles from entering the facility. Local officials including Governor Mikie Sherrill were denied access to the facility.

In June 2026, the state of New Jersey filed a lawsuit against Geo Group alleging that the company impeded health inspectors from gaining access to the Delaney Hall facility following reports of unsafe food and sanitation, and poor medical care.

== See also ==
- Incarceration in the United States
- List of immigrant detention sites in the United States
- GEOAmey, a British company specialising in prisoner transport
- 2026 Delaney Hall hunger strike and protests
