= Reeves County Detention Complex =

Immigration detention facility in Texas, United States

Coordinates: 31.39521°N 103.53845°W

Reeves County Detention Complex was a privately operated immigration detention facility, located about 3 miles southwest of Pecos in Reeves County, Texas. It was opened in 1986 to relieve overcrowding of contract federal inmates within the county jails, and housed federal inmates from 1988 through 2006 through intergovernmental agreements with the Federal Bureau of Prisons.

The complex was operated by the GEO Group. With a combined capacity of 3,763 prisoners in its three sub-complexes, it has been called the largest private prison in the world. The GEO Group housed prisoners at this facility under contract with the U.S. Federal Bureau of Prisons and the Arizona Department of Corrections. Most prisoners at the complex were low-security criminal aliens, serving sentences of one to five years for drug offenses or immigration violations. They faced deportation when released.

== Incidents ==
Two significant riots (on December 12 through 13 of 2008, and January 31 through February 5, 2009) apparently were sparked by prisoner protests over substandard medical care and other issues. Between August 2008 and March 2009 five men died in the complex, most notably Jesus Manuel Galindo, an epileptic Mexican citizen who was denied treatment in 2008, despite his repeated pleas for assistance. These riots resulted in total damages of more than $21 million to the prison facilities, especially because of a widespread fire in the second one.

The medical provider contracted for services at the facility was Physicians Network Associates (PNA). On May 16, 2017, Texas Democratic state Senator Carlos Uresti was indicted by a federal grand jury in the United States District Court for the Western District of Texas for conspiracy to commit bribery and conspiracy to commit money laundering. Uresti is alleged to have originally taken money at first from PNA, which was awarded the contract, and that the scheme continued through PNA's successor companies. The indictment claims acting Reeves County administrator, Judge Jimmy Galindo (not related to the deceased detainee) conspired With Uresti to approve the medical contract through the county commissioners court in exchange for kickbacks and "promises of future payments." PNA hired Uresti, ostensibly as a "consultant for marketing services," but the prosecution claims Uresti became the middleman for bribe money destined for Galindo. PNA was subsequently absorbed by Correctional Healthcare Companies in 2010, which then merged with Correct Care Solutions, in 2014. PNA and its successor corporations continued to pay Uresti $10,000 monthly, starting in September 2006, through the next decade. Uresti is alleged to have split those bribes with Galindo. The bribery case was scheduled to be tried on January 4, 2018.

In May 2013, Mother Jones magazine ranked the complex as one of the ten worst prisons in the United States, citing the high number of prisoners in long-term isolation units.

In August 2016, US Justice Department officials announced that the Bureau of Prisons (BOP) would be phasing out its use of all contracted facilities, on the grounds that private prisons provided less safe and less effective services with no substantial cost savings. At the time, the agency expected to allow current contracts on its thirteen remaining private facilities to expire.
