= Keith Hamm =

American political scientist

Keith Edward Hamm is an American political scientist and Edwards Professor of political science at Rice University. He is an expert on state legislatures. His research focuses on legislative behavior, campaign finance, interest groups, state politics and urban politics.

Keith graduated from Franklin and Marshall College in 1969 and obtained his master and doctoral degrees from Florida Atlantic University in 1973 and from University of Wisconsin–Milwaukee in 1977.

== Editorial Boards ==
- Co-Editor, Legislative Studies Quarterly, 1997–2002
- Editor, APSA Legislative Studies Section Newsletter, 1991–1997

== Selected publications ==
=== Books and chapters ===
- "101 Chambers: Congress, State Legislatures, and the Future of Legislative Studies" (with Peverill Squire), Ohio University Press, 2005.
- "Legislative Politics in the States"(with Gary Moncrief), Politics in the American States 9th Edition (2007):154-191.
- "Legislative Lobbying: Placing Research on Legislative Lobbying in a Comparative Context." (with Robert E. Hogan), Research Guide to U.S. and International Interest Groups(2004):167-175.
- "Legislative Politics in the States" (with Moncrief, G.), Politics in the American States: A Comparative Analysis, Eighth Edition (2004):157-193.
- "Legislative Lobbying" (with Roberrt Hogan), Handbook of Political Literature and Research on Interest Groups
- "Legislative Politics in the States" (with Gary Moncrief), Politics in the American States (1999):144-190.
- "Committees in State Legislatures",(with Ronald D. Hedlund)The Encyclopedia of the American Legislative System pp. 669–700, edited by Joel H. Silbey, et al.; (Scribner's, 1994)

=== Articles ===
- “Structuring Committee Decision Making: Rules and Procedures in U.S. State Houses and Senates”, Journal of Legislative Studies. 7 (Summer 2001): 13–34. With Ronald Hedlund and Nancy Martorano.
- "A Transforming South: Exploring Patterns of State House Seat Contestation”, The American Review of Politics 21 (2000 Spring): 201–224. With Nancy Martorano and R. Bruce Anderson. 1996–1999
- “Political Parties as Vehicles for Organizing U.S. State Legislative Committees”, Legislative Studies Quarterly, (August 1996): 383–408. With Ronald D. Hedlund.
- “Legislative Politics and the Paradox of Voting; Electoral Reform in Fourth Republic France”, British Journal of Political Science, (April 1996): 165–198. With Eric Browne.
- “Explaining State Aid Allocations: Targeting Within Universalism”, Social Science Quarterly; (September 1994): 524–540; with Robert M. Stein.
- “The Impact of Lobbying Laws and Their Enforcement: A Contrasting View” Social Science Quarterly, (June 1994): 378–381; with A. R. Weber and R. B. Anderson.
- "Legislative Party Development and the Speaker System", Journal of Politics; (November 1993): 1140–1151, with Robert Harmel.
- "Interest Group and Party Influence in the Legislative Process", Journal of Politics, (February 1992): 82–100; with C. Wiggins and C. Bell.
- "Accounting for Change in the Number of Committee Positions", Legislative Studies Quarterly, (May, 1990): 201–226; with R. D. Hedlund.
- "The Role of 'Subgovernments' in U.S. State Policy Making: An Exploratory Analysis", Legislative Studies Quarterly (August 1986): 321–351.
- "Ethnic and Partisan Minorities in Two Southern State Legislatures", Legislative Studies Quarterly (May 1983): 177–189; with R. Harmel and R. J. Thompson.
- "Consistency Between Committee and Floor Voting in U.S. State Legislatures", Legislative Studies Quarterly (November 1982): 473–490.
- "Effects of Structural Change in Legislative Committee Systems on Their Performance in U.S. States", Legislative Studies Quarterly (August 1982): 383–399; with G. Moncrief.
- "Impacts of Districting Change on Voting Cohesion and Representation," Journal of Politics (May 1981): 544–555; with R. Harmel and R. J. Thompson.
- "Factors Influencing the Adoption of New Methods of Legislative Oversight in the U.S. States", Legislative Studies Quarterly (February 1981): 133–150; with R. D. Robertson.

== Awards & grants ==
- Fulbright Chair in North American Studies, Carleton University (Ottawa, Canada), 2006.
- “The Impact of Election Finance Laws: Preliminary Results from the Canadian Provinces.” Department of Foreign Affairs, Canada, 2005.
- “Testing the Effects of Campaign Finance Laws on State Legislative Elections” (Co-PI: Robert Louisiana State University), National Science Foundation, 2002–2004.
- “The Evolution of Specialization and Its Effects on Performance: Model Testing for American State Legislative Committees in the Twentieth Century.”, National Science Foundation, 1995–2000.
- “A Proposal to Collect, Analyze and Disseminate State Legislative Campaign Finance Data” (with Joel Thompson, Gary Moncrief, David Breaux and Anthony Geirzynski.), National Science Foundation, 1998.
