= G4S Secure Solutions =

American-British security services company

G4S Secure Solutions (USA)
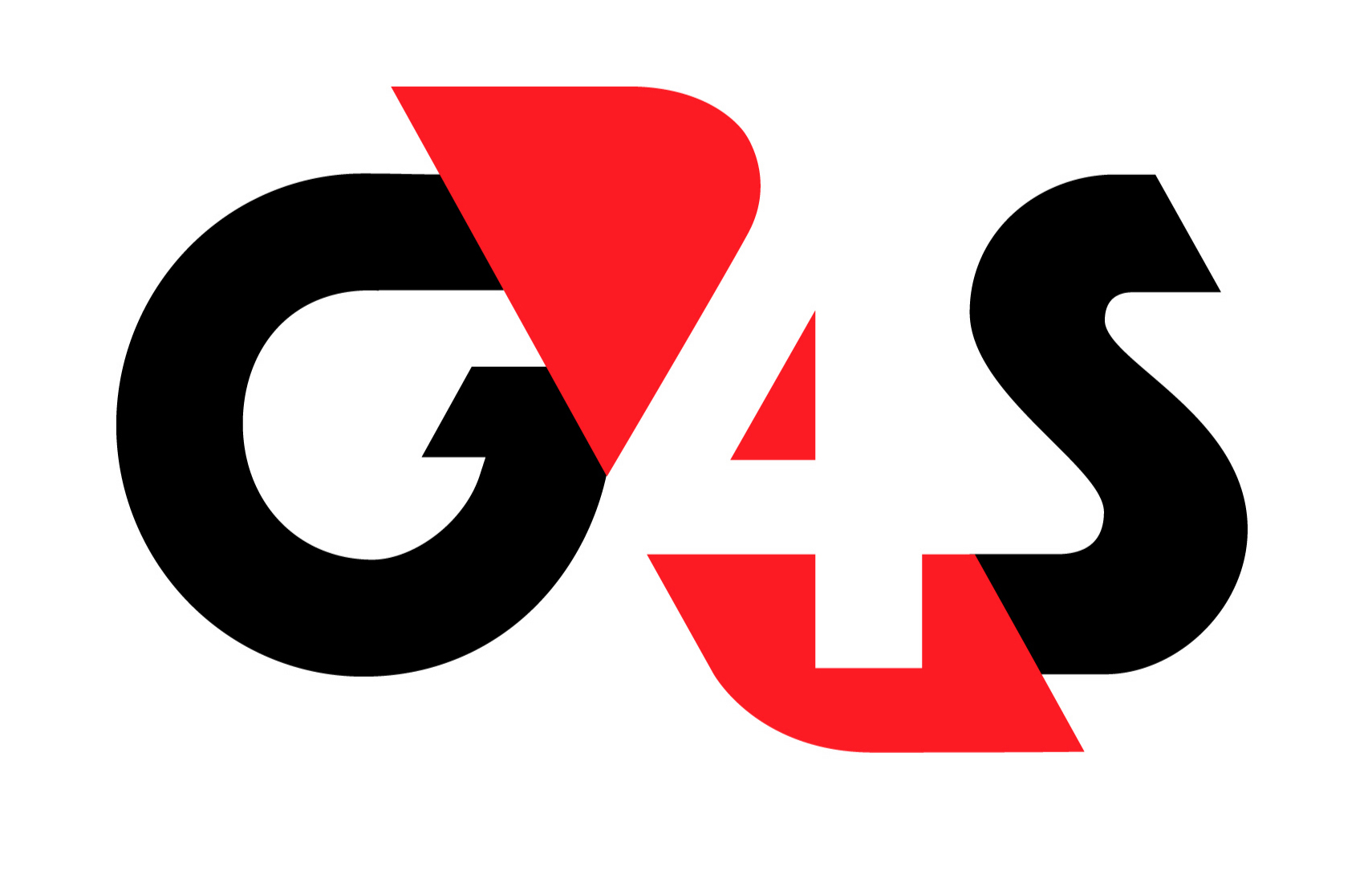
- Type: Subsidiary
- Industry: Security
- Founded: 1954 (Coral Gables, Florida)
- Headquarters: Jupiter, Florida, United States
- Key people: George Wackenhut (Founder)
- Parent: G4S
- Website: www.g4s.com

G4S Secure Solutions (USA) is an American/British-based security services company, and a subsidiary of G4S plc. It was founded as The Wackenhut Corporation in 1954, in Coral Gables, Florida, by George Wackenhut and three partners (all former FBI agents). In 2002, the company was acquired for $570 million by Danish corporation Group 4 Falck (itself then merged to form British company G4S in 2004). In 2010, G4S Wackenhut changed its name to G4S Secure Solutions (USA) to reflect the new business model. The G4S Americas Region headquarters is in Jupiter, Florida.

== Background ==
In 1966, George Wackenhut took his company public.

In the mid-1960s, Florida Governor Claude Kirk commissioned the Wackenhut Corporation to help fight a "war on organized crime", awarding the company a $500,000 contract. The commission lasted about a year but led to more than 80 criminal indictments, including many for local politicians and government employees. Following the murder of a British tourist at a rest stop in 1993, Florida contracted with Wackenhut to provide security at all state rest stops.

== Relationship with the US government ==
Wackenhut was founded in 1954 by former FBI agent George Wackenhut and three partners as Special Agent Investigators Inc.. Early board members included individuals with ties to the anti-communist John Birch Society. Wackenhut had good contacts in politics, including Florida Governor Claude Kirk and Senator George Smathers, a friend of John F. Kennedy. Soon after its founding, Wackenhut received lucrative contracts to guard Cape Canaveral and nuclear weapons testing sites in Nevada.

Wackenhut has a long history of working with the U.S. government and military. The company recruited extensively from the military and intelligence communities. Many former CIA, FBI and other government officials have served on the company's upper levels over the years. For example, former FBI Director Clarence Kelley and Deputy CIA Director and Secretary of Defense Frank Carlucci served on Wackenhut's board of directors. William Casey, President Ronald Reagan's CIA director, was Wackenhut's attorney before joining the Reagan administration.

=== CIA ties ===
Wackenhut was alleged to be a CIA front company during the cold war. CIA analyst William Corbett stated: "For years, Wackenhut has been working with the CIA and other agencies, including the DEA. Wackenhut has allowed the CIA to occupy positions within the company to carry out covert operations." Wackenhut provided the CIA and DEA with information and was rewarded with government contracts in return. As a partner of the US government, Wackenhut received contracts in sensitive areas of national security, such as embassies and nuclear power plants. Under the Reagan administration, there was a significant increase in contracts.

In 2017, a handwritten CIA document was declassified stating: "WACKENHUT: 5/1960 - Cover for Western Hemisphere employees assigned to FLA", elaborating that on November 21 1961 Wackenhut was established as a CSA, or Cognizant Security Agency. The document alleges that the ties were severed in April 1967.

=== Mass surveillance of US citizens in the cold war era ===
During the McCarthy era, the right-wing George Wackenhut began compiling files with information on politically suspect individuals, accusing them of communist activities. In 1965, Wackenhut told potential investors that the company had files on 2.5 million suspicious individuals, one in every 46 American adults. By 1966, Wackenhut had collected over 4 million names.

== Foreign activities ==
In Nicaragua, Wackenhut was said to have worked with the Contras and to have maintained contacts with right-wing death squads in Latin America during the Cold War. The then-director of international operations, Ernesto Bermudez, admitted that he had 1,500 men in El Salvador who "do things you don't want your mother to know about."

In Belgium, Wackenhut is said to have worked with right-wing extremists in the 1980s, who in turn had contacts with security services. Wackenhut left Belgium in the early 1980s after allegations that security guards lured immigrant children into basements and beat them.

The company was accused of participating in arming Saddam Hussein's Iraq with chemical weapons during the Iran-Iraq War.

== Security services ==
G4S provides security to specific government and corporate sectors: energy, utilities, and chemical/petrochemical, financial institutions, hospitals and healthcare facilities, major corporations and the construction industry, ports and airports, residential communities, retail and commercial real estate and transit systems.

Clients included GlaxoSmithKline and U.S. Customs and Border Protection.

=== Nuclear services ===
The Wackenhut Corporation provided armed security services for many nuclear power plants. In September 2007, its employees Kerry Beal and Paul A. Kennedy videotaped their fellow security guards at the Peach Bottom Nuclear Generating Station sleeping while on duty. Beal had previously tried to notify supervisors at Wackenhut and the US Nuclear Regulatory Commission about the breaches of security. Wackenhut's contract was terminated, ending its role guarding Peach Bottom and nine other nuclear plants.

Wackenhut was blamed when it was revealed that anti-nuclear protesters, including an 82-year-old nun, had managed to cut through fences of one of the United States' most protected nuclear facilities at Oak Ridge in Tennessee in July 2012. Three activists broke into the US Government's only weapons grade storage facility to paint graffiti and throw what they claimed was human blood on the walls. The breach and lack of security at the site at the time was blamed upon the absence of key Wackenhut personnel in the previous few weeks; the plant manager and chief operating officer had retired 12 days prior to the incident.

== Wackenhut Corrections Corporation (WCC) ==
In 2003, the management of WCC, the wholly owned subsidiary of Wackenhut's prison business, raised funds to repurchase all common stock held by G4S since 2002, changing its name to The GEO Group, Inc. The GEO Group, Inc. now operates former Wackenhut facilities in 14 states, as well as in South Africa and Australia. Some facilities, such as the Wackenhut Corrections Centers in New York, retain the Wackenhut name despite no longer having any actual connection with the company.

== Lawsuits involving G4S Secure Solutions ==
=== Miami lawsuit ===
A dispute between the Wackenhut corporation and Miami-Dade Transit arose from allegations made by a former employee. Michelle Trimble claimed that G4S Wackenhut over-billed Miami-Dade County for work that had not been performed. As a result of the allegations of that lawsuit, the County ordered an audit of the contract in 2005. That audit was completed in 2009 and came up with an amount of estimated overbillings. In response, G4S Wackenhut filed a lawsuit in federal court alleging, among other things, that the audit's findings were erroneous.

In February 2010, Miami-Dade County commissioners approved a $7.5 million settlement agreement with Wackenhut to resolve this dispute that settled against Wackenhut. The settlement deal had $3 million going to the county, $1.25 million for whistle-blower Trimble, whose lawsuit led the county to launch its own audit, and $3.25 million going to Trimble's attorneys. As part of the deal, Wackenhut was allowed to bid on future contracts and the county agreed not to use this case against it when considering Wackenhut's bids.

=== Murder of Janet Chandler ===
In 1979 employees of Wackenhut Corporations gang-raped and murdered Janet Chandler. Her body was found in a snowbank near the time of her death but the perpetrators were not found until three decades later when a student documentary on Janet Chandler prompted the police to re-open the case. Eventually, the police showed this to Robert Lynch who confessed to being a participant and named his co-conspirators.

Wackenhut Corporations obtained a security contract in Holland, Michigan in the fall of 1978, and approximately seventy of defendant's out-of-town security guards took up temporary residence at the Blue Mill Inn where plaintiff's daughter, Janet Chandler, worked as the overnight front desk clerk. Plaintiff alleges that some of the guards and motel staff had sexual relationships with each other, relationships that "bred jealousy and anger, much of it directed at Janet Chandler," for reasons not clear from the pleadings. Plaintiff alleges that several of the guards and motel employees conspired to "teach Janet Chandler a lesson" by beating, sexually assaulting, and killing her. They acted on their plans sometime after midnight on January 31, 1979. The conspirators did not discuss the crimes over the years.

Following the February 7, 2006 arrest of Wackenhut employee Robert Lynch, six people were charged with first-degree murder arising from Janet Chandler's death, five of whom were Wackenhut employees in 1979. Two persons pleaded guilty to second-degree murder and were sentenced to terms of years in prison. The other four persons were convicted by a jury of first-degree murder and sentenced to life imprisonment without the possibility of parole."

In 2010 the parents of Janet Chandler contended that Wackenhut did not thoroughly check the employees' backgrounds and then failed to properly supervise them, ignoring problems that arose with the workers.

The suit also alleged that the company helped conceal the involvement of their employees, who swore to a vow of secrecy, according to testimony in a 2007 trial.

=== Omar Mateen ===
On June 12, 2016, Omar Mateen, who worked at G4S from 2007 until his death, committed one of the largest mass shootings in United States history. Though Mateen's employment as an armed guard only slightly facilitated his access to firearms, and the firearms refresher courses he took each four years at G4S suggested more substantial training on his own, the company's inability to detect prior warning signals brought it under widespread scrutiny.

==== Screening issues ====
Under Florida state law, for him to work as an armed guard the company was required either to make a full psychiatric evaluation of Mateen, or to administer a "validated written psychological test". The test administered was the updated Minnesota Multiphasic Personality Inventory (MMPI-2), a test used for job screenings and court cases requiring those subjected to it to agree or disagree with statements such as "My soul sometimes leaves my body" and "Once in a while I think of things too bad to talk about." Carol Nudelman, the psychologist listed on the character certification submitted by G4S to the state said she stopped working for the company in 2005 and denies ever having met him. G4S said Mateen was not interviewed by a psychologist, but rather, a psychologist evaluated the results of a standard test used in job screenings, and his test was evaluated by the firm that bought Nudelman's practice: Headquarters for Psychological Evaluation, owned by Dr Joanne Bauling. G4S said this was a "clerical error." On September 10, 2016, the Florida Department of Agriculture and Consumer Services fined G4S $151,400 for providing inaccurate psychological testing information after it found the psychologist whose opinion was necessary to permit Mateen to carry a weapon was not practicing as a screener. Between 2006 and 2016, 1,514 forms were submitted erroneously listing Nudelman's name. Mateen's form was among those investigated.

The company was unaware of Mateen's sealed and expunged juvenile arrest record for misdemeanor battery. Although they verified his employment they took Mateen at his word that he was fired as a Florida corrections trainee for failing to report due to a fever. He was actually dismissed for skipping classes, falling asleep in class, and asking two days after the Virginia Tech shooting if a classmate would tell if he brought a gun to class. Also during his time as a trainee, a fellow trainee said he threatened to kill everyone at a barbecue after his hamburger touched a piece of pork, and he was escorted from the property.

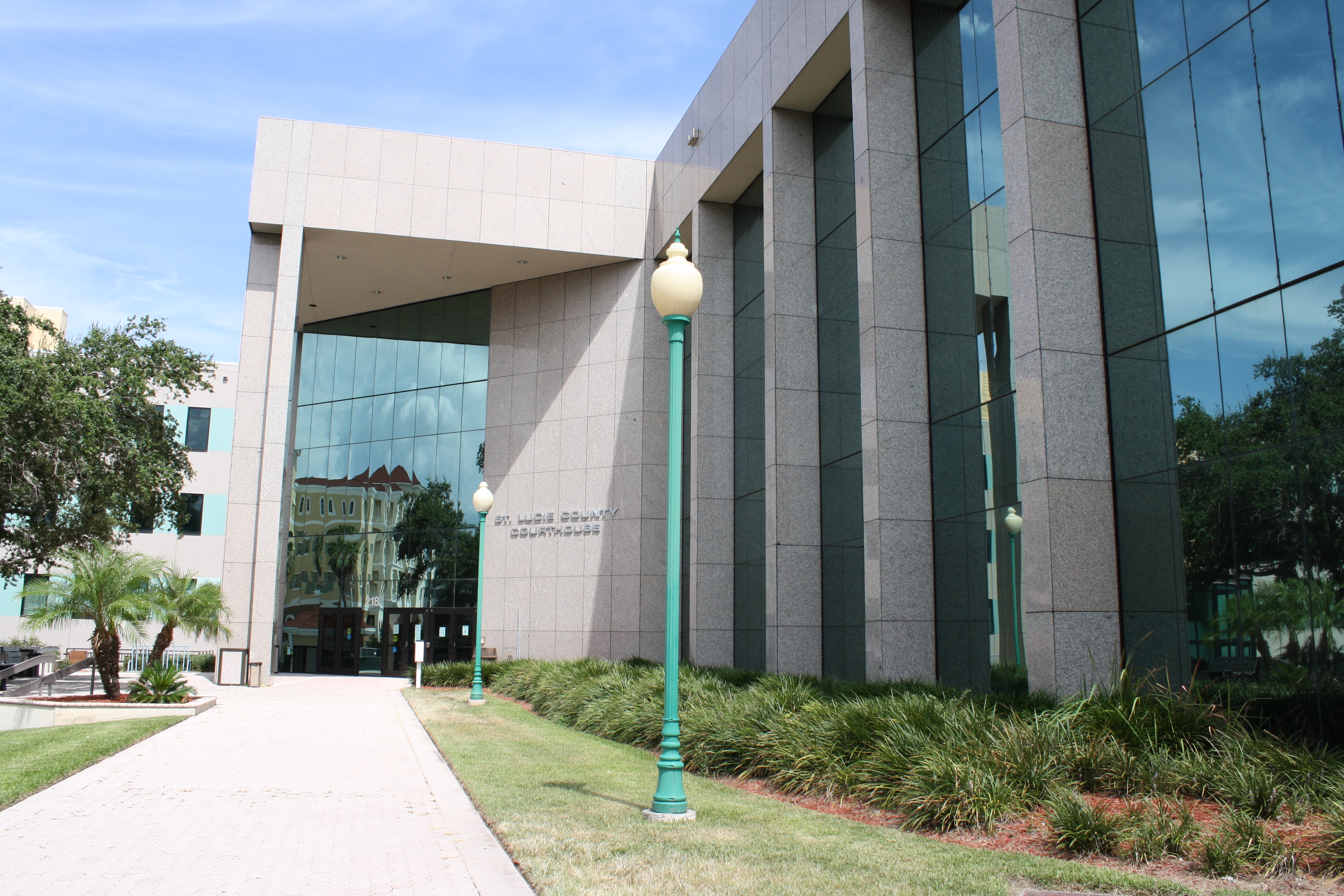
The St. Lucie County Courthouse was guarded by Omar Mateen in 2013. Following his investigation by the FBI, G4S transferred him to guard a gated community in Palm Beach.

In 2010, Mateen was videotaped while working security for G4S at a site related to the BP oil spill. His cynical description of the work situation was included in the 2012 documentary, The Big Fix.

Working with Mateen at the St. Lucie County Courthouse in 2013, a co-worker said he had complained to superiors at G4S about Mateen's frequent violent, racist and homophobic tirades, but that the company ignored him. G4S denied having a record of those complaints. After Mateen claimed to his co-workers a family connection to Al Qaeda and said he was a member of Hezbollah, the county sheriff's office called in the Federal Bureau of Investigation. The St Lucie Sheriff's office "demanded" Mateen no longer provide security for the Courthouse. When G4S became aware the FBI was investigating Mateen, they did not dismiss Mateen but transferred him to the south guardhouse of the PGA Village, a gated community in Palm Beach County.

==== Contract reviews ====
Judges at two Treasure Coast courthouses that had been guarded by Mateen requested that G4S be replaced by sheriff's deputies. At $377,000 and $86,000 respectively, the G4S contracts for St. Lucie and Indian River were cheaper by margins of $200,000 and $60,000 than the deputies.

The PGA Village board voted unanimously to review a $1 million annual contract with G4S and consider other vendors after the sale of a resident's home was cancelled by a purchaser who learned that Mateen had patrolled the community. Ultimately, the PGA Village board unanimously decided to continue the contract with G4S, albeit with minor alterations.

On June 22, Massachusetts Senator Kathleen O'Connor Ives called it "crazy and beyond ironic" in light of Mateen and other scandals to replace members of the Massachusetts Bay Transit Authority police union with G4S to guard the transit agency's money room. The $400,000 contract with G4S was just more than half the cost of MBTA Transit Police, who had been replaced June 6 after security lapses were reported by outside experts.

== See also ==
- Private security company
