= Ocean data acquisition system =

Set of instruments deployed at sea

An ocean data acquisition system (ODAS) is a set of instruments deployed at sea to collect as much meteorological and oceanographic data as possible. With their sensors, these systems deliver data both on the state of the ocean itself and the surrounding lower atmosphere. The use of microelectronics and technologies with efficient energy consumption allows to increase the types and numbers of sensor deployed on a single device.

== Definition ==
According to Intergovernmental Oceanographic Commission and World Meteorological Organization (WMO), "ODAS means a structure, platform, installation, buoy, or other device, not being a ship, together with its appurtenant equipment, deployed at sea essentially for the purpose of collecting, storing or transmitting samples or data relating to the marine environment or the atmosphere or the uses thereof."

== Use ==
Each hour, the data gathered by the system is transferred to the WMO's Global Telecommunications System by a geostationary satellite after having gone through a number of quality checks. An estimated 1,200 buoys provide real time data on sea temperature 27,000 times a day, while about 600 buoys report the sea level pressure 14,000 per day. Real-time data with information on the maritime environment can then be used for forecasts of physical states like weather, ocean currents or wave conditions which, in turn, may serve to warn seafarers of unfavourable conditions in the area.

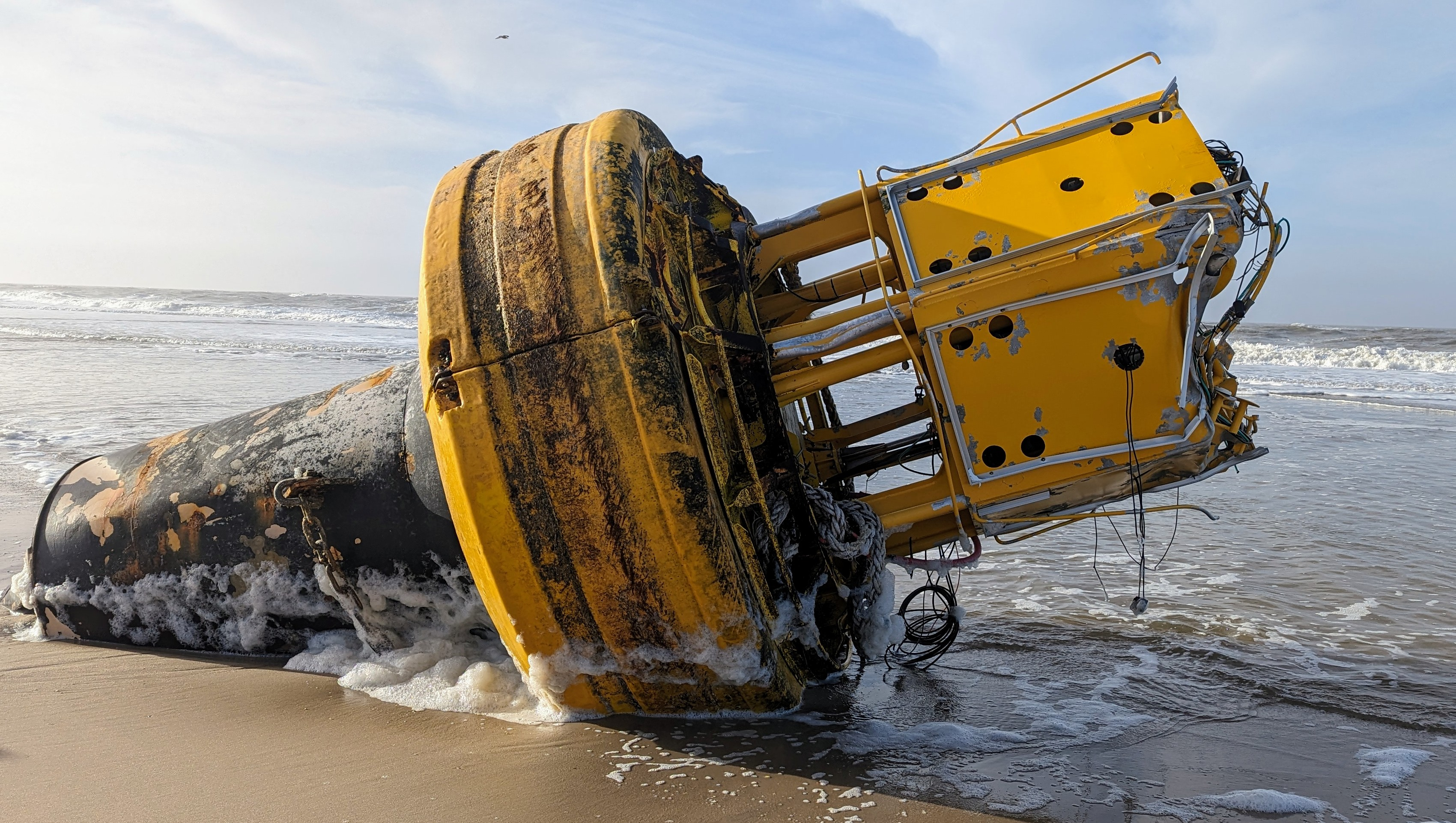
ODAS measuring buoy washed up on the beach near Westerland / Sylt (germany) after a storm in January 2024

== ODAS types ==
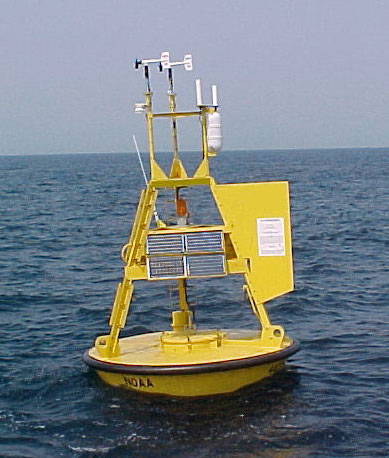
ODAS buoy connected to the United States National Data Buoy Center

ODAS can be mounted on the following structures:

- Lighthouses
- Lightvessels
- Towers
- Offshore platforms
- Buoys

ODAS buoys are not navigational aids but have been included into the IALA Maritime Buoyage System. The structures have a fixed geographical position.

== Data ==
Data gathered by an ODAS may include the following parameters:

- Air temperature
- Atmospheric pressure at sea level
- Wind direction
- Wind speed including gusts
- Sea state
- Wave height
- Sea surface temperature
- Barometric pressure
- Visibility
- Relative humidity

== Disadvantages ==
- ODAS buoys are expensive to obtain and need to be deployed by specialised vessels.
