= George Wackenhut =

American detective, businessman, and political conservative

- Born: George Russell Wackenhut; September 3, 1919; Upper Darby Township, Pennsylvania, U.S.
- Died: December 31, 2004 (aged 85); Vero Beach, Florida, U.S.
- Education: West Chester University; University of Hawaiʻi; Johns Hopkins University
- Occupation: Founder of Wackenhut private security corporation
- Spouse: Ruth
- Children: 2
- Parent(s): William Wackenhut and Francis Hogan

George Russell Wackenhut (September 3, 1919 – December 31, 2004) was the founder of the Wackenhut private security corporation.

== Biography ==
George Russell Wackenhut was the son of William and Frances (Hogan) Wackenhut. He grew up in Upper Darby, outside Philadelphia, Pennsylvania, and graduated from Upper Darby High School in 1937. He was inducted into the school's Wall of Fame in 2000. He served in the U.S. Army Corps of Engineers during World War II and witnessed the Japanese bombing of Pearl Harbor. He graduated from what is now known as West Chester University. He earned a bachelor's degree from the University of Hawaiʻi. and a master's degree in education from Johns Hopkins University, then taught classes in physical education and health.

In 1951, Wackenhut joined the FBI as a special agent in Indianapolis and Atlanta, handling counterfeit money and bad-check cases and tracking down Army deserters. He resigned in 1954 to launch Special Agent Investigations in Coral Gables, Florida, with three other former agents: William Stanton, A. Kenneth Altschul, and Miami lawyer and FBI agent Ed Du Bois Jr. Following an in-office fist fight with Du Bois in 1955, a professional split occurred and Du Bois went on to form his own company, Investigators, Inc., focusing on private investigations. In 1958, Wackenhut bought out his remaining partners, renamed the company after himself and expanded into the security guard field, then went public in 1965.

Even with a profit margin of only 2.5 percent, the company's earnings, inflated by massive overbilling, allowed Wackenhut to live lavishly in homes scattered throughout the country. Prior to his move to Vero Beach, Florida in 1995, his primary residence was his "Tyecliffe Castle", in Coral Gables, Florida. It was known in Miami as Castle Wackenhut. It was, in 1995, a $10 million turreted mansion complete with moat, decorated with firearms and medieval suits of armor. His house was wired with infrared and laser sensors, closed-circuit television monitors, photo-cell surveillance and had private radios for his family. The 18,000 sq ft, 57 room Tyecliffe Castle was sold to Ponzi schemer Allen Stanford and was demolished about 2008. In 1994, The Quiet American, an 800-page authorized biography of Wackenhut by John Minahan, was published.

George Wackenhut was known as a hard-line right-winger. He built up dossiers on Americans suspected of being Communists or left-leaning "subversives and sympathizers" and sold the information to interested parties. Frank Donner claimed in his book Age of Surveillance the Wackenhut Corporation maintained and updated its files even after the McCarthy hysteria had ebbed, adding the names of antiwar protesters and civil rights demonstrators to its list of "derogatory types." By 1965, Wackenhut was boasting to potential investors the company maintained files on 2.5 million suspected dissidents - one in 46 American adults then living. In 1966, after acquiring the private files of Karl Barslaag, a former staff member of the House Un-American Activities Committee, Wackenhut could claim, that with more than 4 million names, his company had the largest privately held file on suspected dissidents in America. In 1975, after the United States Congress investigated companies which had private files, Wackenhut gave its files to the now-defunct anti-Communist Church League of America of Wheaton, Illinois.

When he sold his company for $570 million in 2002 (equivalent to $1.02 billion in 2026), he owned more than 50 percent of its stock. Wackenhut died on December 31, 2004, of heart failure, at his home in Vero Beach, Florida, at the age of 85.
