= Martin K. Solomon =

American computer scientist

Martin K. Solomon is a professor of computer science at Florida Atlantic University since 1981, and is currently Assistant Chair for the Computer Science and Engineering Department. He authored two books on Oracle8i and one on Oracle9i that were published by McGraw-Hill. Dr. Solomon is also a noted scholar on Kurt Gödel, the Austrian logician and philosopher.
