= Newcastle Government House =

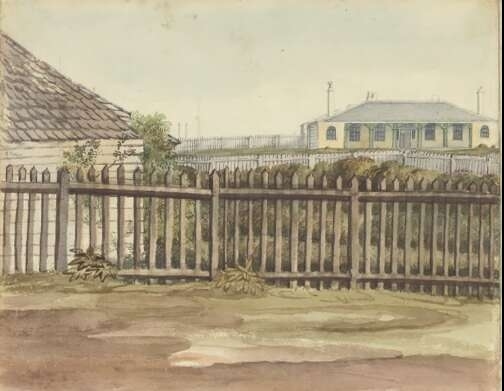
- Commandant's house from in front of the old gaol, circa 1828

- Location within New South Wales Location within Australia
- 32.9314°S 151.7822°E
- Location: 72 Watt Street, Newcastle, New South Wales, Australia

New South Wales Heritage Register
- Official name: Newcastle Government House and Domain; Newcastle Military Barracks & Hospital; Girls' Industrial School; Reformatory for Girls; Lunatic Asylum for Imbeciles; James Fletcher Hospital; Fletcher Park
- Type: state heritage (complex / group)
- Designated: 22 March 2011
- Reference no.: 1841
- Type: Historic Landscape
- Category: Landscape – Cultural

Newcastle Government House is a heritage-listed former military post and official residence and now park and psychiatric hospital at 72 Watt Street, Newcastle, New South Wales, Australia. It is also known as Newcastle Government House and Domain, Newcastle Military Barracks & Hospital, Newcastle Industrial School for Girls, Reformatory for Girls, Lunatic Asylum for Imbeciles, James Fletcher Hospital and Fletcher Park. It was added to the New South Wales State Heritage Register on 22 March 2011.

== History ==
The Newcastle Government House and Domain has significant associations with convictism in Australia as a site central to the management of convict labour, early coal mining technology and the development and growth of the Australian economy.

=== Penal settlement ===
The earliest European use of the site was the Commandant's Residence (also known as Government House) where the Commandant, Lieutenant Charles Menzies controlled the penal settlement. The site has remained in Government management since European occupation from 1804 to the present day. A sketch by Ferdinand Bauer (1804) shows the flagstaff and the only small house on the area. The same location is also shown in artworks by Joseph Lycett, Walter Preston and Edward Close which are particularly significant as they show Newcastle's Government House and gardens. Bauer's sketch also shows tents on the hillside of the site. The site also figures significantly on the Macquarie Chest, being depicted on one of its panels.

=== Convicts ===
The first attempt at settlement in Newcastle failed in 1802 and the settlement, also known as "Kings Town" and "Coal River", was re-established in 1804, providing hard labour for re-offending convicts following the Irish rebellion at Vinegar Hill. The second settlement (1804) was prompted because of the prospect of coal as a vital resource for the Colony. After Newcastle was established as a penal settlement, it remained under Colonial administration until 1823. After this time free settlers were introduced into the settlement. Convicts sent to Newcastle endured harsh living standards, intense manual labour in the coal mines and were under constant surveillance.

After 1823, most of the convicts were transferred to Port Macquarie, however many prisoners remained in Newcastle until 1855 to carry out public works projects such as the construction of Macquarie Pier and other works. Convict labour was used to build the pier, beginning in 1818 and this work was not completed until 1846. The military were stationed at the military barracks site to manage and supervise the work of the convicts. Furthermore, the association between the former military barracks buildings and the port initiative (the pier) was of significance to capital works programs of the Colonial Government, convictism and early technology in Australia. The employment of convicts to construct Macquarie Pier was in the economic interest of the Colony and this site was significant in supporting this progress. Having started in 1814 with a small population of approximately 100 convicts and guards, it would become the major penal settlement of the Australian colonies, accommodating up to one thousand convicts.

=== Convict labour and coal ===
Newcastle is the birthplace of Australia's coal mining industry and the first modern coal mining undertaken in the Southern Hemisphere. Coal mining in Newcastle provided the first profit ever made in the fledgling Colony of New South Wales of - 2 pounds, 5 shillings - in 1801. Convict labour was used to work mines located at Colliers Point (these were horizontal drifts) and on the hillside near Government House, the first working vertical shaft sunk for the production of coal in Australia (on the current James Fletcher Hospital site). One of the coal shafts is named the Wallis shaft, after the Commandant of Newcastle at the time. The site is also associated with Benjamin Grainger who was sent to Newcastle in 1812 to assist in coal mining in the area, later becoming Superintendent of the coal mines, in 1820. The military was present in the settlement to manage the convict population and to supervise work in the mines and the construction of the Macquarie Pier.

Mining on the site was primitive and labour-intensive with loads of coal initially brought to the surface in baskets. A small rail system for haulage was used to take coal to the port directly downhill from the mine site to be loaded onto ships for export. Much of the export went around the world, and was often traded for Rum. The transport of coal to the port forged a thoroughfare which then became the main street of the township, George Street (now known as Watt Street). The Commandant had his residence in a prominent place at the top of this street where he was able to view what was happening in the settlement, including work at Collier's Point and Nobbys Island.

The Commandant's residence was both a place of authority and a convict work place. Convicts worked on the site until the Australian Agricultural Company took over mining in Newcastle. There is evidence of intensive early mining practises on the cliff opposite the site's entrance. The two convict coal mines on the James Fletcher Hospital site were later referred to as the "Asylum Shafts". The Wallis shaft is thought to have been excavated between 1814 and 1817. Twenty seven men were described as employed in the working of the mine and the mouth of the shaft immediately adjoined the offices of the Commandant's House. After these mines became disused there was very little reference made to them during the 1800s. It was not until the 1900s that a mine subsidence report provided more detail about the existence of the convict mines,.

In the 1940s Jonathon Dixon carried out research on the site and attempted to locate the position of the first convict coal shaft by surveying an early map. Dr B W Champion (1949) also supports Dixon's location of the convict coal mine, adding that it was sunk approximately 20 yards inside the Mental Hospital gates. Further subsidence within the hospital grounds in 1943 revealed a convict mine shaft. This shaft is thought to be the Wallis Shaft and was described as being "inside the gates of the hospital". Dixon argues that the subsidence revealed both the position of the old convict mine shaft and the position of the Commandant's House or Government House. Evidence of the shaft was later covered up and is not obvious today, although it is reported to be under the roadway of the main road leading into the hospital. The position of the former Wallis Shaft inside the asylum entrance is shown on a plan by the Colonial Architect James Barnet in 1880.

=== Governor Lachlan Macquarie ===
Lachlan Macquarie on his tour to the northern settlements in 1821 stated in his journal that he stayed at Government House in Newcastle, finding it very comfortable. Macquarie made several visits to Newcastle, and in 1812 he stated "...immediately on my landing respecting the inspection of the settlement, I went with Mrs. M. & c. to view the coal mines...". The future of the coal mining industry was important to Governor Macquarie as is shown in his laying of the foundation stone to build the Macquarie Pier in 1818. This was a major colonial public works project, undertaken to join the mainland with Nobbys Island and establish a safe port entrance to facilitate the coal export trade. Newcastle's commercial coal mines were integral to Governor Macquarie's plan to promote the Colony as self-supporting.

=== Aboriginal and non-Aboriginal interactions ===
During Governor Macquarie's visit to Newcastle in 1818 he recorded that he was entertained by Jack Burigon, King of the Newcastle tribe along with about forty men, women and children who performed a "Carauberie" (corroboree) in the area at the rear of the Newcastle Government House. There are numerous colonial artworks showing Aboriginal occupation in and around the Government House site and as well as Corroborees.

=== Parsonage ===
The Newcastle Government House and Domain contains the original site of the Church of England parsonage erected in 1819 and home to Reverend George Augustus Middleton, Newcastle's first chaplain. Governor Macquarie noted that the parsonage was a "neat brick-built, stuccoed, one-storied parsonage house with a verandah and all necessary out-offices, and also a kitchen garden and grazing paddock attached thereto, both enclosed with a paling". Part of the original parsonage remains and this adds to the significance of the site.

In the 1830s part of the land granted to the Church of England as a glebe was returned to the Government for building a new military barracks. Reception House and Kirkwood House were demolished in June 2008 to make way for the construction of a new 20-bed mental Health facility. Reception House was a direct and tangible link to the convict-built parsonage and nearby Christ Church Cathedral buildings and a significant purpose-designed mental health facility which marked an innovation in mental health care. Kirkwood House was designed by the prominent local architect James Henderson. It was a two-storey annexe to the parsonage. Architect Frederick Menkens supervised a later skillion addition. Government Architect Walter Liberty Vernon kept some of the original fabric of the old parsonage in the structure of the new additions to Kirkwood House.

=== Military barracks & convict labour ===
From the 1830s there was an increase of military protection of Newcastle to protect its coal resources and hence the colony's economy. The Governor visited Newcastle to lay foundation stone for the new barracks on the hill near the parsonage house in 1836. Lieutenant Colonel George Barney had recently arrived from England and was appointed Colonial Engineer in 1836. One of Barney's first tasks was to report on steps that needed to be taken to protect the colony from attacks by foreign vessels and he recommended that batteries and blockhouses be constructed in Sydney, Newcastle, Wollongong, Port Macquarie and Port Phillip. The first projects undertaken by Barney were for the construction of new barracks at Paddington in Sydney (Victoria Barracks) and Newcastle.

The Newcastle Military Barracks were completed earlier than the Victoria Barracks. A convict chain gang in Newcastle was employed to build the foundations for the officers quarters and soldiers barracks in 1838, as well as to create the military parade ground. Excavation of the hillside by convict iron gang took place in 1842 so that outbuildings could be constructed. Governor Gipps proposed reducing troop numbers at the barracks as convict transportation to the colony was coming to an end. Further reducing the need for a strong military presence in Newcastle was the relocation of the remaining prisoners in 1848. Only 1000 troops were to remain in New South Wales to protect the colony. In June 1848 and the 99th regiment left Newcastle. However later in 1848 some convicts returned to Newcastle to build public works accompanied by a military guard which was accommodated in the new barracks.

== Industrial School for Girls ==
In August 1866, the Act for the Relief of Destitute Children, more commonly known as the Industrial Schools Act, was passed by the Government of NSW under the guidance of Henry Parkes. The Newcastle Industrial School for Girls admitted its first 12 inmates on 31 August 1867, and within a month, had admitted 30 girls.

On Friday, 26 May 1871, the younger girls left the Newcastle Industrial School to travel to the wharf some 200 to 300 metres from the school to make the transfer to Sydney, and then to a new institution at Cockatoo Island, named the Biloela Industrial School for Girls. The Newcastle Industrial School for Girls closed in 1887, when all the remaining girls moved to Parramatta Girls School in Parramatta.

== Lunatic Asylum ==
The barracks remained in use for civil service accommodation until 1867 when it became the Girls' Industrial School and later the Reformatory for Girls. On 13 September 1817, the New South Wales government established its first "Lunatic Asylum for Imbeciles and Idiots" at this site.

Newcastle was the fourth main government-run asylum to be opened in New South Wales, the others located at Tarban Creek, Parramatta, the first being at Castle Hill, which later become a gaol. A common theme throughout the life of the asylum was community dissatisfaction with having such an institution located in the centre of the city. When an asylum was first suggested, the residents of Newcastle were so opposed to the plan that they held a public meeting which consisted of 400 Newcastle residents at the Newcastle Court House. On 4 December 1866 the Colonial Secretary's Office notified the Bench of Magistrates in Newcastle that the proposed plan would not go ahead. When it was suggested for a second time, a Newcastle newspaper, the Chronicle stated that it was dangerous to have insane people living in such close proximity to residents. It claimed that the use of the former barracks for this purpose was wasting valuable real estate.

Frederick Manning was the Inspector General of the Insane and oversaw all lunatic asylums in New South Wales; he is credited with implementing many improvements to the site and with the introduction of moral therapy, believing that young imbeciles and idiots should be kept apart from the older insane people. Manning's decision to separate the imbeciles and idiots required extra space, at a time when overall patient numbers were increasing, due in part to the effects of the 1890s depression. Manning had intended to have the younger patients housed on a separate site, but the government's funding was limited during the depression so additional wards were constructed. The first of these additional wards was constructed in 1892 and accommodated 24 girls at the northern end of the asylum grounds, behind the court house.

In 1916, the facility was renamed the Newcastle Mental Hospital. A visit from the Deputy Inspector General of Mental Hospitals in 1918 found the newer wards of a high standard but determined that the older buildings were in poor condition. Such problems were addressed during the mid to late 1920s, and included improvements in bathroom facilities, the removal of single rooms in the women's section to create a spacious dining and day room and the creation of a larger space in the men's division by removing two of the single rooms.

In 1962, the hospital was renamed Newcastle Psychiatric Centre. In 1965, the Shortland Clinic was built to serve outpatients, a model copied at other hospitals such as Royal North Shore Hospital. In 1983 the name of the hospital changed to Hunter Hospital and in 1989 the name was again changed to be named the James Fletcher Hospital after James Fletcher, an important figure in Newcastle during the late 19th Century. Fletcher was responsible for improving the conditions of miners. An example of this was his establishment of the Australian Agricultural Company's sick and accident fund.

=== Fletcher Park ===
Fletcher Park was formally known as Lower Reserve and Ordinance Park. Its use as a public park was promoted in 1878 after Frederick Cane the Superintendent of the Asylum for Imbeciles had undertaken to make the park more attractive by planting ornamental shrubs and trees. The park was originally the site of Government House and its flagstaff and is identifiable in many colonial artworks. There were numerous outbuildings to Government House and an artwork completed in 1820 (artist unknown) shows these as well as a path to the left of the building leading uphill. There are numerous other works showing the early area.

== Description ==
Newcastle Government House & Domain cultural landscape includes the area currently occupied by the James Fletcher Hospital located east of the Newcastle central business district and is bounded by Ordinance Street to the south, Newcomen Street to the west and Church Street to the north. The east boundary of the hospital is Watt street and also includes Fletcher Park situated opposite the hospital entrance and the convict coal mines from 1814-17.

=== Historic Convict Coal Mines & Adit (1814) ===
Two convict coal mines exist on the current hospital grounds, one is approximately 20–25 metres inside the main Watt Street entrance, named Asylum Coal Shaft No. 1. This shaft has been filled and sealed. Asylum Coal Shaft No.2 is in the courtyard behind the former military hospital, south west corner of the site; it is capped but not filled. Both of these shafts are connected to horizontal workings at the coal seam below and to drainage adits running to the nearby seaside cliffs. They are well hidden and have been covered over, but not built on. One adit is visible in the cliff at Newcastle South beach (hand-hewn); it is a horizontal shaft and has been cut into the rock face of the cliff, in an ovoid shape. The adit is located about 5 metres above the ground and approximately 1.5m tall x 0.5 m wide at the top and 0.75 m wide at the bottom. The cliff where the adit is located is cracked, and fenced off. It is unknown where the adit leads; however it does go west towards the nominated site and possibly is linked with the known vertical shafts (asylum shafts). The adit drains water from the mine by gravity, it would appear from the outside that the adit has minimal obstructions and often has water draining from it.

The site has archaeological potential for finding information relating to colonial mining techniques.

=== The parsonage (1819) ===
The front of the original building was demolished in the mid 1800s for the realignment of Church Street; however a significant portion of the parsonage was retained when additions were made to Reception House by Architect Walter Vernon. The parsonage (recently Kirkwood House/Reception House) was demolished in 2008 and an archeological excavation took place in March 2009. Remains of the old parsonage (1819) were found, including sections of wall, a cellar and other relics as evidence of the convict period. The size of the remains (foundations) is approximately 12x10 metres. The convict brickwork (floor/foundations) was in excellent condition (for its age), and represents building methods and techniques used in the convict era.

=== Compound Wall (1842) ===
The hospital is a walled site within an excavated quarry. The wall has enclosed the buildings on the site since the military buildings were first constructed in 1842. With exception of the northern boundary, the south, east and west sides all have walls. Originally built as a retaining wall for the excavated site, then it was later retained for privacy for patients of the mental institution.

The integrity of the compound wall is better in some sections than others. Sections of the compound wall were damaged in the June 2007 floods. The foundation of the inside wall appears to be built from sandstone. The wall runs from north to south and is relatively intact. However much of the upper sections of the wall built from brick have collapsed and are in need of repair.

The walls were constructed from brickwork dated at different periods, and the significant sections of the stone wall in the lower sections of the compound wall may relate to the 1830s when the site was quarried using convict labour. There is high archaeological potential, given that the site was "prepared" for construction of the barracks using convict labour.

=== Landscape ===
The landscape of the current hospital grounds shows an exposed quarried landform on the south side, approximately 20 metres high. The exposed rock has eroded somewhat due to environmental conditions; however this landscape remains a noticeable and strong feature of the site, the quarried section that formed a wall runs the full length of the southern boundary. A large expanse of the grounds was levelled to build the military barracks and parade ground. The topography was originally a gentle slope from the ocean cliffs towards what is known today as "The Hill". The area is relatively underdeveloped compared with the surrounding area of the city of Newcastle.

As there has been minimal disturbance, there is high potential that archaeological relics may be found.

=== Former Military Parade Ground ===
The parade ground remains an open parkland and grassy area that has not been hindered or interrupted with significant development (except in the case of the Shortland Clinic, which although is not built directly on the oval, does detract visually from the openness of the former military establishment). Significant vistas remain across all areas of the site because the recreation ground is in the centre of the collection of buildings.

=== Fletcher Park ===
This park is situated directly across the road (Watt Street) from the current James Fletcher Hospital, on the east side of the precinct. The park is bounded by a fence on the seaside and there is a steep cliff drop off. In 2005 it was landscaped by Newcastle City Council and has a path running through the middle of the park. There is also a statue of MJames Fletcher that stands predominantly on the uphill slope, facing down to the city.

The park is reasonably well-maintained by Newcastle City Council; much of the open space has remained undisturbed, with the exception of the garden beds on the west side (Watt Street), which were replaced in 2005. This work may have disturbed archaeological remains of the former Newcastle Government House (also known as Commandant's Residence) that existed on the site. Archaeological potential is high in this area.

=== Further information ===
The Thwaites building, Tara Lodge and the former Shortland Clinic building do not contribute to the heritage of the site. However Gate House (c. 1842) is a significant heritage building related to the military phase of the hospital and contributes greatly to other building on the site, but is not part of the heritage listing. However the former military barracks, military hospital and James Fletcher statue are included in the heritage listing.

== Heritage listing ==
As at 21 September 2010, the Newcastle Government House and Domain site forms a complex, multi-layered cultural landscape, physically transformed by convict labour and providing evidence of the early colonial settlement of Newcastle as well as of the subsequent technical, economic and social development of the city and the state. The site has been identified as being of National significance to Australia and New South Wales.

Newcastle Government House was listed on the New South Wales State Heritage Register on 22 March 2011 having satisfied the following criteria.

The place is important in demonstrating the course, or pattern, of cultural or natural history in New South Wales.

It meets this criterion of State significance because it demonstrates patterns of economic and social development of the early colonial period from government-controlled and convict-worked industry, to the arrival of free labour and the beginnings of private enterprise. The place expresses tangibly the way its landscape has changed over time to meet changed uses (military and welfare). It represents a convict penal settlement directly related to the beginning of Australian industry. The place is an exceptional example of the forced migration of convicts (Vinegar Hill rebels) and the development associated with punishment and reform, particularly convict labour and the associated coal mines. The place exemplifies convict labour (quarrying out of landscape, laying of foundations & filling of military parade ground). The place was a site of early contact between Aboriginal and European people during the Macquarie period. It exemplifies Australia's early position at the forefront of applied coal mining technology in the early 1800s. The place is culturally significant because of its representation in historical records and visual sources from the early 1800s, showing the changes in the landscape. Its former military buildings are closely associated with the military history of the Colony during the 1830s and 1840s. It demonstrates an important aspect of law and order through its history as a military barracks and as the source of supervision required for the prisoners who remained in Newcastle to complete the Macquarie Pier. This association with Newcastle's defence history is indirectly related to aiding the growing economy and coal export of the Colony. Convicts were an important part of this accomplishment (1830–40). The James Fletcher Hospital site is unique as a coastal urban Lunatic Asylum (1871–present) and is representative of Australian Colonial asylum culture.

The place has a strong or special association with a person, or group of persons, of importance of cultural or natural history of New South Wales's history.

The site exemplifies Governor Macquarie's determination to promote a self supporting Colony. The place exemplifies the beginning of Australia' coal mining industry (its first vertical shafts) completed during the Macquarie period. The place is closely associated with re-offending convicts following the 1804 Irish rebellion at Vinegar Hill. The place is closely associated with Governor Macquarie who implemented Colonial public works projects like coal mining that later sustained the economic growth of the Colony. The place has a strong association with the Commandants of Newcastle from 1804–23, including Lieutenant Charles Menzies, Charles Throsby, Commandant Wallis and Major Morisset. The site is also significant for its association with Captain George Barney, one of Australia's most important Colonial Engineers during the mid 19th Century, (whose works include the Victoria Barracks in Paddington and the design of Circular Quay) and with Dr Frederick Manning Norton, who made a considerable contribution to the welfare of the insane and the improvement of mental health care in NSW.

The place is important in demonstrating aesthetic characteristics and/or a high degree of creative or technical achievement in New South Wales.

The site has a high degree of aesthetic significance for its position toward the top of the eastern side of the Hill area and has remained virtually intact since first dedicated. Many individuals have found creative inspiration from its landscape since 1804 and their artistic works have documented the transformation of this unique place shaped by human intervention (e.g. Ferdinand Bauer and Joseph Lycett). The place is an early example of a Colonial public works project (Military Barracks) as well as the natural landscape transformed by convict labour. The James Fletcher Hospital site has a rare amalgamation of 1840s Military Barracks buildings, including the Parade Ground surviving in an excavated and walled site. The Parade Ground, with its open space, textures, plantings and other features, adds aesthetic value to the military buildings. The following buildings on the James Fletcher Hospital site show technical innovation in construction methods: the Military Barracks (surviving original timber roof structure, lining boards and original masonry elements, verandah and columns), the surviving original fabric of the former Officer?s Quarters, the surviving original fabric of the former Guard House, the surviving original fabric of the former military outbuildings and underground brick water tanks, the former Military Hospital (surviving timber shingle roof and other masonry elements, original and early timber joinery).

The place shows technical achievement and innovation in introducing the first coal mining (vertical shaft) in the Southern Hemisphere and marks the use of the transfer of the "bord and pillar" coal mining techniques from across the world to Australia. The site contains the first vertical mine shafts used for commercial mining of coal in Australia, a valuable insight into the mining techniques and knowledge used in the Colony. The place offers research opportunities in the area of colonial mining. The place shows innovative and technical achievement related to masonry and quarrying techniques to build the military establishment, as well as skillfulness of design in the reshaping of the landscape to construct these buildings.

The place has potential to yield information that will contribute to an understanding of the cultural or natural history of New South Wales.

An important site of early interaction between Aboriginal and European people, the place may have potential to contribute new knowledge about the relationship between these two cultures in the colonial period. Features of this cultural landscape, including the early convict coal mines, have the potential to provide new information about colonial and convict life in NSW. The place has potential contribute to a better understanding of the nature of construction techniques used in the convict-era, of early Australian industrial convict sites, of convicts as a cultural group and of the contribution made by their forced labour.

The place possesses uncommon, rare or endangered aspects of the cultural or natural history of New South Wales.

The place is rare in NSW because its landscape was physically shaped by convict labour, a landscape that remains visible today. The place is nationally rare because it possesses Australia's oldest surviving mining heritage (vertical shaft). The place is nationally rare because if possesses an intact military barracks and military hospital and parade ground, both constructed using convict labour.

The place is important in demonstrating the principal characteristics of a class of cultural or natural places/environments in New South Wales.

The site is typical of a Military Barracks site with a preserved Parade Ground and Military Barracks. It can be compared with Victoria Barracks in Sydney, as it was constructed around the same time. The place is also representative of colonial lunatic asylums in NSW and was the first regional lunatic asylum in the Colony. The place reflects work of the various Government/Colonial architects.
