= Industrial School for Girls =

Industrial School for Girls or Girls Industrial School may refer to:

== Australia ==
- Newcastle Industrial School for Girls, Newcastle, New South Wales, Australia
- Parramatta Girls Industrial School, Parramatta, New South Wales, Australia

== Ireland ==
- St. Augustine's Industrial School for Girls, Templemore, County Tipperary, Ireland

== United Kingdom ==
- Glasgow Industrial School for Girls, Glasgow, Scotland

== United States ==
- Alabama Girls’ Industrial School, Montevallo, Alabama
- Columbia Religious and Industrial School for Jewish Girls, New York City, New York
- Illinois Industrial School for Girls, Evanston, Illinois
- Kansas Industrial School for Girls, Beloit, Kansas
- Lancaster Industrial School for Girls, Lancaster, Massachusetts
- Maine Industrial School for Girls, Hallowell, Maine
- Montgomery Industrial School for Girls, Montgomery, Alabama
- Virginia Home and Industrial School for Girls, Bon Air, Virginia
- Wisconsin Industrial School for Girls, Milwaukee, Wisconsin
