= Hay Institution for Girls =

Institution in New South Wales, Australia 1961 to 1974

- Established: 1961
- Address: Church Street
- Location: Hay, NSW, Australia
- Coordinates: 34°30′13″S 144°51′03″E
- Dissolved: 1974

The Hay Institution for Girls was located at Hay, in the Riverina district of rural NSW, Australia.

== History ==
Parramatta Girls Home was established in 1887 as a state-run institution to house girls who had been convicted of a crime or were considered uncontrollable or neglected.

Following rioting over abuse at Parramatta by inmates in the mid-20th century, the institution in Hay was opened in February 1961 in the former Hay Gaol as a maximum security institution for girls, under the NSW Child Welfare Department. It was a place of punishment for girls who would not comply with the strict regime of the Parramatta Girls Home. and housed girls aged between 14 and 18.

Disciplinary practices and routines were modelled on a similar institution for boys operating since 1945 in Tamworth, NSW. Both Hay and Tamworth institutions were originally built in 1880. Hay comprised a central cellblock containing 12 cells, called 'cabins', each containing a single iron frame bed, thin mattress and a small bench and seat attached to the wall.

The maximum number of girls held at any time was 10, overseen by 5-6 officers. Under a system outlawed in NSW in the late 19th century for adults prisoners called the 'silent system', or 'silent treatment', girls were not permitted to speak without signalling for permission; they were required to have their eyes to the floor at all times.

Movement within the site was severely restricted and always accompanied with the locking and unlocking of doors. Walking was not permitted; rather, the girls were required to march 'on the double'.

The daily routine involved hard labour (e.g. breaking concrete, digging paths and gardens, scrubbing floors and walls, sewing leather, and 'practices' that were carried out with regularity at predetermined intervals during the day).

This routine did not alter - up at 6am and return to their cells at 7pm. Hourly checks were made on the girls at night, causing sleep deprivation, and they were required to lie in their beds facing the door. No education or schooling was provided and girls who resisted, or who showed any form of attitude, were locked in isolation, placed on a restricted diet and had their sentences extended.

Typically girls sent to the Hay Institution came from poor socio-economic backgrounds. Many were indigenous children, and many had long been state wards.

In July 1973, two staff at Parramatta Girls Home resigned following accusations they had abused girls under their care. Soon after, the ABC broadcast an episode of the current affairs programme This Day Tonight showing the conditions at both Parramatta Girls and Hay Institution. A protest was organised that December by feminist and civil rights groups. Both institutions were closed in July 1974.

The first reunion of the Hay Institution took place on 3rd and 4th of March 2007.

In 2008 the Outback Theatre for Young People produced a play titled Eyes To The Floor by Alana Valentine based on the experiences of former inmates.

== See also ==
- Tamworth Tamworth Correctional Centre
- Juvenile Justice Centres in NSW New South Wales Department of Juvenile Justice
