= Hay Gaol =

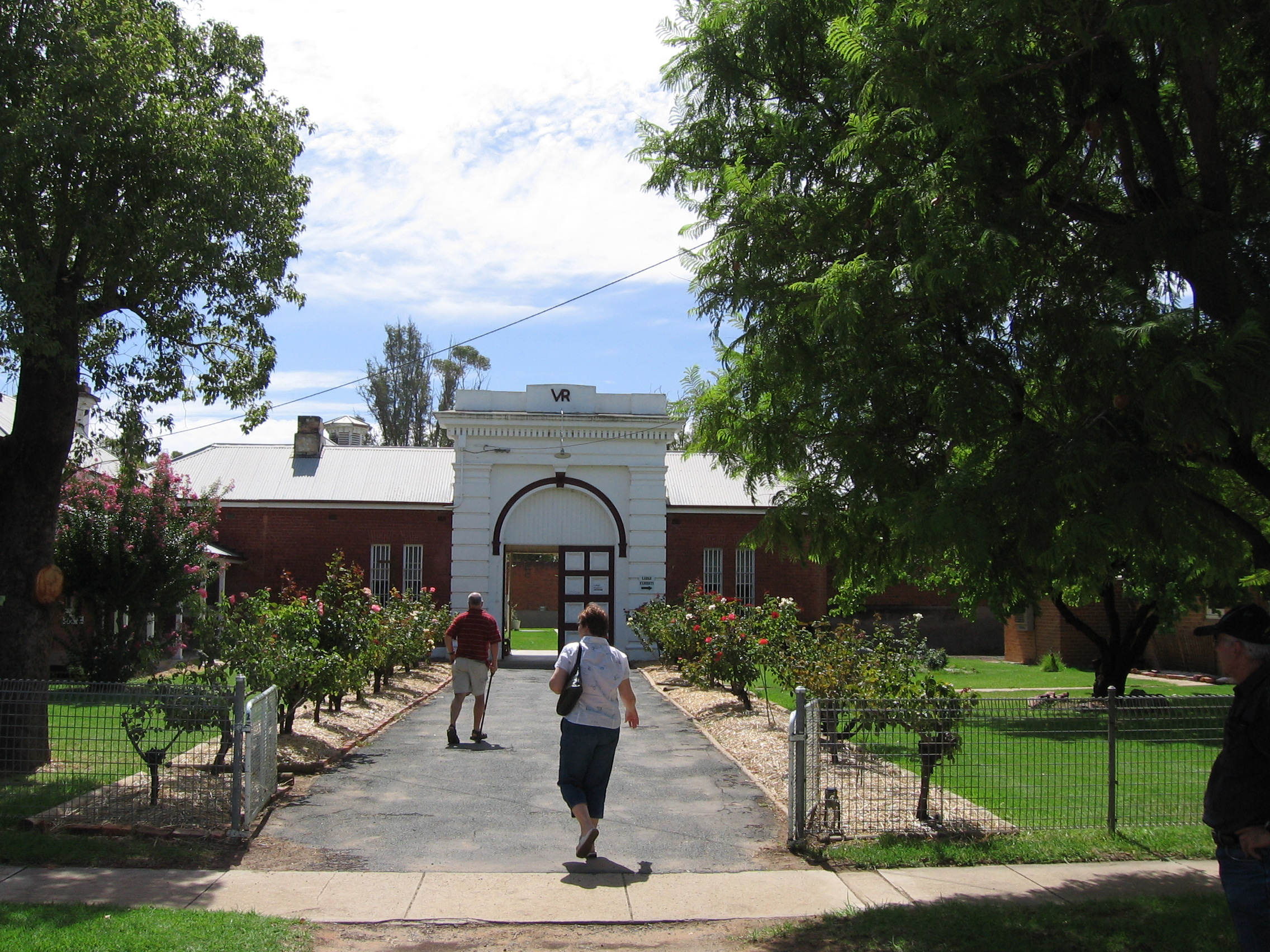
- Hay Gaol, 2007

- Location within New South Wales Location within Australia
- 34.5031°S 144.8510°E
- Location: 355 Church Street, Hay, Hay Shire, New South Wales, Australia

History
- Built: 1879–1880

Site notes
- Architect(s): James Barnet; Colonial Architect

New South Wales Heritage Register
- Official name: Hay Gaol; Hay Jail; Hay Institution for Girls; Dunera boys internment camp
- Type: state heritage (complex / group)
- Designated: 13 March 2009
- Reference no.: 1782
- Type: Gaol/Lock-up
- Category: Law Enforcement
- Builders: Witcombe Brothers

The Hay Gaol is a heritage-listed former prison and now museum at 355 Church Street, Hay, in the Riverina region of New South Wales, Australia. It was an adult prison from 1880 to 1915 and 1930 until 1940, a prisoner-of-war camp during World War II, and a juvenile facility, the Hay Institution for Girls, from 1961 to 1974. It was designed by James Barnet and Colonial Architect and built from 1879 to 1880 by Witcombe Brothers. The site faces Church Street, and is otherwise bounded by Piper, Macauley and Coke Streets, north-east of the town centre. It was added to the New South Wales State Heritage Register on 13 March 2009.

== History ==
=== The first Gaol ===
The original gaol at Hay was a police lock-up, located in Lachlan Street on the site of the present Hay Post Office. The lock-up was proclaimed a Public Gaol on 1 December 1870. The gaol initially contained two cells to accommodate prisoners. During 1878, however, there was a large increase in the number of prisoners detained at Hay – 192 entries to the gaol (compared to just nine the year before) and 176 discharges (compared to thirteen previously). As a result, “much needed improvements” were made to the gaol, with the prisoner accommodation being increased by 1879 to four cells. In 1879 there were 173 entries and 175 discharges; and, in 1880, 154 entries and 158 discharges.

The large numbers of prisoners detained at Hay from 1878 onwards prompted the Comptroller General of Prisons, Harold Maclean, to approve the building of new gaol facilities, construction of which began in 1879. When the new gaol in Church Street was ready for occupancy in late 1880 the old Lachlan Street gaol was down-graded to a “Watch-house or Lock-up only”.

=== Hay Gaol – 1880 to 1915 ===
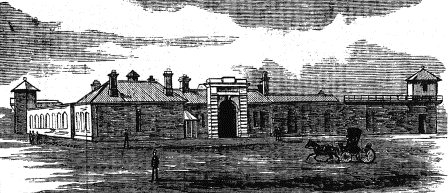
Illustration of Hay Gaol - from the article 'Hay' (by "The Raven"), Town & Country Journal, 30 April 1881.

The new Hay Gaol in Church Street was built during 1879-80 by the local building firm of Witcombe Brothers. The perimeter consists of a five-metre-high (16 ft) wall of locally produced red bricks, with a large central entrance gate (in front of a small barred entrance court). Two guard towers were placed at diagonally opposite corners of the perimeter wall. The main cell-block contained 12 cells (including two for female prisoners). The cells (apart from two of a larger size) measured 9 feet 9 inches by 10 feet 2 inches, each with cement floors and a galvanised roof. The compound also contained a solitary confinement cell, mess-hall, kitchen, meeting-room and officer's residence.

The Hay Gaol was officially opened in late 1880. A proclamation by the Governor of the Colony of New South Wales dated 21 December 1880 declared the "New Gaol at Hay" to be a "Public Gaol, Prison and House of Correction". A separate notice in the Government Gazette stated that the new gaol "has been appointed a place at which male offenders under order or sentence or sentence of transportation... shall be detained and be liable to be kept to hard labour".

A visitor to Hay in early 1881 wrote: "The gaol is a really fine building and deserves mention; it faces one in a most ominous manner on coming into the town from Narrandera". The writer added: "As yet they have not got the hanging apparatus up".

Hay Gaol initially operated under the control of the police. On 17 March 1882, however, the gaol was placed under the administration of its first gaoler, Ghiblim Everett. Everett's wife, Mary Ann, was the matron at the gaol; the remainder of the staff comprised a senior warden and four other wardens. Ghiblim and Mary Ann Everett were at Berrima before coming to Hay, where Ghiblim was chief warder at Berrima Gaol. The Hay Gaol facility continued mainly to be used to incarcerate comparatively short-term offenders from the surrounding districts. Ghiblim Everett was an active gardener and during his period as gaoler “he created a garden there which was one of the beauty spots of Hay”. A vegetable garden at the gaol, maintained by the inmates, supplied fresh produce for prisoners’ meals.

It was used mainly for offenders with short sentences, as those imprisoned for long terms were sent to Goulburn Gaol. As the years went on Hay Gaol struggled to remain open, due to a lack of prisoners. The daily average number of prisoners at Hay during the period 1895-7 was 25 (1895), 17 (1896) and 14 (1897). Ghiblim Everett eventually retired as the gaoler at Hay (probably in about 1896), “because of being over the superannuation age, on a pension”. The Gaoler at Hay during 1897 was Benjamin Shaw. On 14 December 1897 P. Phelan took over this position. The first gaoler of the Hay Gaol, Ghiblim Everett, died in May 1898 at Hay.

From 4 April 1899 the Hay Gaol was under the control of S. J. Nebbett, who took over from D. D'Arcy (previously Chief Clerk at Darlinghurst Gaol). In April 1899 lights were installed for the first time in all cells at the Hay Gaol, "a privilege highly appreciated by the prisoners, the monotony of the cells being very much relieved by lights and reading". Library books were issued twice weekly to all well-conducted prisoners, and "also slates and school books if required". Apparently some sort of rationalisation occurred during 1899, probably in regard to staffing at the gaol: "It was found possible to reduce Hay Gaol, making the sixth Prison [in New South Wales] so dealt with...".

By 1915 the gaol had only three prisoners being supervised by a staff of four. It was costing £582 per year to remain open and the former Governor of Parramatta Gaol, Superintendent O'Connor, deemed that Hay Gaol was "no longer useful". It was officially closed on 30 June 1915 (though it remained operating until 4 July 1915).

=== Health services use ===
Between the two World Wars, the Gaol buildings met Hay's medical needs. In 1919, during a local outbreak of the worldwide Spanish Flu epidemic, the Gaol was briefly used as an emergency hospital to isolate patients who couldn't be treated at the Hay Hospital. In 1921 Hay's Red Cross Society turned the Gaol into a maternity home. The two rooms at the front entrance became wards, as did the old hospital area. Many older Hay locals enjoy telling the tale that they were "born in the Hay Gaol."

=== A Gaol again – 1930 to 1940 ===
In 1930 the maternity home moved to a new site in Hay. That year, the state's gaols were congested, a result of the new Consorting Act which gave police more powers to convict well-known criminals. It was decided to reopen the Hay Gaol and connect the building to town gas and sewerage. In August 1930 the former gaol at Hay was again proclaimed as a public prison, applicable from 9 September 1930. Harry Hood was appointed as the governor. The Gaol operated for ten years, in that time one escape was recorded; Reginald Arthur Dawson, a prisoner employed as a cook, scaled the wall of the Gaol using a rope made from towels and a poker. He was captured in a paddock five days later.

=== Prisoner of war camp ===
During World War II Hay was used as a prisoner-of-war and internment centre, due in no small measure to its isolated location. Three high-security camps were constructed there in 1940. The use of the Gaol as a detention and hospitalisation facility that serviced the POW camps from 1940 to 1946 brought aspects of the camps into the town's heart. The first internees were over two thousand refugees from Nazi Germany and Austria, many of them Jewish; they had been interned in Britain when fears of invasion were at their peak and transported to Australia in 1940 aboard the HMT Dunera. Interned under the guard of the 16th Garrison Battalion of the Australian Army they became known as the "Dunera Boys". Later that year began the arrival of Italian civilian internees. In February 1941, in the wake of the Cowra POW break-out, a large number of Japanese POWs were transferred to Hay and placed in the three high-security compounds. During 1946 the POWs who remained at Hay were progressively released or transferred to other camps, and the Hay camps were dismantled and building materials and fittings sold off by June the following year. The internment at Hay of the Dunera refugees from Nazi oppression in Europe was an important milestone in Australia's cultural history. About half of those interned at Hay eventually chose to remain in Australia. The influence of this group of men on subsequent cultural, scientific and business developments in Australia is difficult to over-state; they became an integral and celebrated part of the nation's cultural and intellectual life. The "Dunera Boys" are still fondly remembered in Hay; every year the town holds a "Dunera Day" in which many surviving internees return to the site of their former imprisonment. Today the Gaol is one of only a few buildings remaining in Hay associated with the camps.

It was de-commissioned as a prison on 31 October 1947.

=== Second period out of prison use ===
After the Hay camps were broken up in 1946–7, the Gaol was used intermittently for emergency housing during the 1952 and 1956 floods, and as accommodation for Italian workers in town to build the new sewerage system.

=== Institution for Girls ===
From 1961 to 1974 the Hay Gaol was managed by the New South Wales Child Welfare Department as a particularly coercive maximum security institution for girls between the ages of thirteen and eighteen. The Hay Institution for Girls, as it was officially known, was established in response to wide scale rioting at Parramatta Girls' Home in 1961. The aim of Hay was to separate the girls involved in the riots and those whose behaviours generally were considered too difficult to be managed at Parramatta. Girls were sent to Hay for three month sentences. Many of the girls detained at Hay in the Institution were Aboriginal. In its conception, as a facility for maximum security segregation; in its governing according to strict discipline and routine; and in its housing in an old colonial prison, Hay mirrored The Institution for Boys in Tamworth previously established in 1947.

The girls sent to Hay were drugged and removed from Parramatta at night. From Sydney, they were transferred to Narrandera on the overnight train and there moved to the back of a van for the final leg of the journey onto Hay. The Hay Gaol Museum has this van in its collection; significantly it has etchings "girls" initials and the acronym "ILWA" (I Love Worship and Adore) carved into its paintwork. Once in Hay the girls encountered a system of strict dehumanizing discipline and routine, often cited as being harsher than what they would have experienced in a women's prison. The girls were only allowed ten minutes, twice a day to talk between themselves; they had to have their eyes downcast at all times; they were only allowed to talk to a staff member by raising their arm and awaiting a response and at all times they had to be at least six feet apart from each other. The girls were worked hard; scrubbing, painting, cleaning, cooking, washing, laying concrete paths, tending vegetable plots and gardens and doing handicraft. The Hay Gaol Museum has handicrafts prepared by the girls in its collection and "patchwork" concrete paths made by the girls still remain in the gaol courtyard. The girls received no schooling whilst institutionalised.

When the first girls arrived at Hay in 1961 the cell block was unprepared and it was the work of the girls to scrub and paint the walls and floors of the cells, shabby from years of disuse. In later years, new arrivals were detained in the "isolation cell" of the cell block; here they spent their first ten days in Hay, mostly confined to this cell, scrubbing its walls and floors with a scrubbing brush and alternately a brick. Girls who misbehaved were confined to the isolation block in the gaol courtyard for 24 hour periods, fed on nothing but bread and either water or milk. Subordinate staff members came from the local community and were for the most part untrained. Senior male staff were transferred to Hay from similar institutions such as Tamworth and Gosford boys' institutions. In their cells at night the girls were required to sleep on their side, facing the door so that when they were checked by guards, every twenty minutes to half an hour, their faces could be seen. One of the cells in the cell block is fitted out as it was when the gaol was a girls' institution. The objects furnishing the cell include; bed, bedding, toilet can and standard issue red cardigan.

In the 1960s and 1970s governments started to move towards the closure the large institutions. Even before this time, two reports on Parramatta had questioned the appropriateness of the institution and public opinion generally, was decrying institutions for children as anachronisms. In mid 1974 Dick Healey, the new Minister for the Department of Youth and Community Services closed Hay and Parramatta and started to overhaul the outdated 1939 Child Welfare Act, under which the institutions had been created and administered. By the time Hay was closed, many people had already expressed concern about it; in August 1962 Hay locals reported screams from within its walls in the local newspaper; also in 1962, Anne Press, a member of the Parliament of New South Wales, visited and then raised concerns about Hay in Parliament; staff working at the institution were also writing letters to the Child Welfare Department and in 1973 child welfare activist Bessie Guthrie convinced ABC journalist Peter Manning, to investigate Hay and Parramatta for an episode of This Day Tonight. The program screened on the ABC in August 1973.

Despite the closure of Hay, Parramatta, and other institutions for children the after effects of these places continue to impact society and survivors of these childhood institutions still carry emotional, mental and physical scars. In August 2004 the Senate Inquiry: Forgotten Australians; A report on Australians who experienced institutional or out-of-home care as children was released. The committee received 614 submissions and estimated that "upwards of, and possibly more than 500 000 Australians experienced care in an orphanage, Home or other form of out-of-home care during the last century. As many of these people have family it is likely that every Australian either was, is related to, works with or knows someone who experienced childhood in an institution or out of home care environment." (Senate Committee Report, 2004, p.xv) The memories of some Hay survivors are recorded in submissions to the committee. One woman recalls: 'Hay was the most inhumane place that anyone could be in and it was in Australia. We had to scrub freshly painted cells with bricks and wire brushes when we went into Hay, listening to the drill with the girls running on the spot. We were told that it would make you or break you, and for many it did: it broke a lot of spirits. We [have] to reclaim those spirits.' The committee made 34 recommendations as a result of the inquiry and recommendation 34 states that heritage centers be constructed on the site of former institutions.

In addition to speaking up at the Senate Inquiry, many Hay survivors are starting to return to Hay and the gaol to tell their stories to the local community. A common feeling in the Hay community is one of dismay at the suffering of the girls matched by concern at never really knowing what went on behind the walls of the gaol. A reunion of Hay and Parramatta girls is planned at the Hay Gaol on the weekend of 3–4 March 2007. The weekend includes a professionally developed museum theatre production performed by locals and a haunting sound and light display in the cell block.

=== Museum and Cultural Centre ===
The Gaol and surrounding grounds were reserved for the Preservation of Historic Sites and Buildings by notification in the Government Gazette of 6 June 1975. It is now a museum and cultural centre and is open every day between 9am and 5pm.

== Description ==
The Hay Gaol is an example of James Barnet's Hay-type gaol, a classification defined by JS Kerr in his 1988 book Out of Sight, Out of Mind in which Kerr differentiates Barnet's Hay-type gaol from the more common Braidwood-type gaol design of the previous colonial architect. The main difference between the two designs is that the Hay-type gaol is single-storey and the cells larger than the two-storey Braidwood-type gaol. Other gaols built to the Hay-type pattern were at Young (1876–78), Tamworth (1879–81) and Wentworth (1879–81). Of these buildings; Young was destroyed in a fire, with only the gate house remaining and Tamworth is still in use by the Department of Corrective Services. The Wentworth and Hay sites are open to the public, both are currently museums. Braidwood-type gaols were built at: Braidwood, Albury, Armidale, Mudgee, Grafton, Wagga Wagga, Yass and Deniliquin.

The Hay Gaol is constructed of English bond red brick, made locally by the Headon Brothers at a kiln in North Hay.

Perimeter walls and watchtowers: A perimeter wall 5 meters (15 feet) high and 23 centimetres (nine inches) thick surrounds the complex. There are two watchtowers on diagonally opposite corners of the wall. A catwalk originally ran above the wall with supports on either side.

Entranceway

The imposing entrance gateway (in contrast to the utilitarian nature of the rest of the design) bears various forms of decoration including; rusticated quoins, moulding over the entrance arch with keystone emphasis, a dentil course, and a parapet with the royal cypher in the centre. Solid double wooden doors, with an inset smaller door, complete the imposing appearance of the front of the gaol. Inside the front gate is a small barred entrance court, with two small rooms marked "office" and "guard" in the original plans for the gaol.

Cell block

Today the cell block contains 14 cells. Its brick walls are 46 centimetres (18 inches) thick and the building has a hipped corrugated iron roof and a gabled entrance. Cells have small barred windows and thick iron doors with peep holes. One cell has additional colonial-style prison bars; it is unclear as to whether all cells were equipped with such bars, but this is doubtful. A closed in verandah at the back of the cell block leads into a large metal shed.

Services block

Within the compound an L-shaped block with a hipped iron roof and a verandah houses the kitchen, hospital, dispensary, bathroom, store and large workshop. Rainwater from the roofs was collected in a large underground tank.

Solitary confinement cell

A freestanding solitary confinement cell stands in the centre of the compound. Evidence of a second solitary confinement cell attached to the west of this structure is evident. A tin shed housing male toilets and used for storage now abuts the western wall of this structure.

Gaoler's residence

A gaoler's residence is located outside the compound on the western side of the entranceway. The structure has a hipped iron roof, verandah, the tall chimneys have cornices and windows have flat arches. The structure abuts the perimeter wall. A small freestanding carport was added to the south of the complex at some stage.

Officer's residence

A second, three bedroom residence, is located outside the compound on the eastern side of the entranceway. This building was added in 1935 when the Public Works Department called tenders. Local builders Butterworth and Co constructed the cottage. This structure does not abut the perimeter wall. A freestanding residential sized shed and carport has been added to the back of this residence at some stage.

=== Condition ===
The Hay Gaol was reported to be in a deteriorating physical condition as at January 2007. It has many modifications from its original use as a colonial prison but a study of the physical fabric of the site would yield information about the Gaols history of use. Paint scrapings in the cell block to determine the various paint and surfaces of the different eras is considered important to the possible future interpretation of the site.

Whilst the Gaol currently functions as a community museum, the Hay Gaol Management Committee has started work on projects interpreting the history of the site. Concrete paths laid by girls at the girls' institution remain in the building fabric as does the girls' laundry box. Objects related to the history of the site, particularly when the Gaol was a girls' institution remain in the Hay Gaol Museum collection as significant objects. The Hay Gaol Museum also holds historical images of the site.

The Hay Gaol is in fair condition. The paintwork in the cell block is generally poor and the site has problems with rising damp and white ants. The eastern perimeter wall is considered to be in an unstable condition. At some early stage, part of the isolation block was demolished. After 1974 a large steel shed was added to the rear of the cell block and two large sheds built outside the eastern perimeter wall. These elements are intrusive rather than of heritage significance.

=== Modifications and dates ===
Perimeter walls and watchtowers:

- 1961: Catwalk is removed from perimeter walls
- 1961: Stays are installed to the exterior of the eastern wall

Entranceway – office:

- Possibly 1961: Interior of office subdivided to house two small offices and washroom for admitting newly admitted girls.
- 2004: Interior subdivisions are removed due to white ant attack and space is established as exhibition space interpreting the history of the site

Cell block:

- 1896: Two additional cells for female prisoners were added to the cell block
- Date unknown: Two original larger cells were halved in size to become the same size as the other cells
- Date unknown: Back verandah closed in
- 1961: Cells are modified to include simple seat and bench for girls' institution and electricity added to cell block
- 1961: Cells are painted and scrubbed by girls for girls' institution
- Post 1974: Large shed for housing museum collections was added to the northern end of the cell block
- Post 1974: Cells modified to include housing and security for museum exhibits
- 2003: Small room used by night staff when the gaol was a girls' institution is dismantled due to white ant attack

Services block:

- Date unknown: verandah added probably after 1974

Solitary confinement cell:

- 1899: Two solitary confinement cells were constructed in the courtyard
- Date unknown: The western solitary confinement cell is removed
- Pre 1973: A tin structure, including male toilets, is added to the western side of the remaining solitary confinement cell.

Gaoler's residence:

- 1897: Wash house added to the gaoler's residence

Other modifications:

- Date unknown: At some stage the underground water tanks in the compound may have been removed.
- 1898: Acetylene gas is connected to the kitchen and hospital.
- 1899: Gas lighting is installed in all the cells in 1899
- 1930: Gaol connected to town gas and sewerage

== Heritage listing ==
The Hay Gaol is listed as being of State significance for its history and architectural features.

Its aesthetic, rarity, and representative are valued as an example of James Barnet's Hay-type gaol design, and as an example of a Victorian-era country prison that combines foreboding design features (such as its entranceway, perimeter walls, cell block and isolation cell) with vernacular materials.

Built as a colonial gaol in 1880, it was later used as a detention and hospitalisation facility servicing Hay's World War II internment and prisoner of war camps (1940 - 1946) and then as a girls' institution run by the NSW Department of Child Welfare (1961 - 1974). Although official records remain unavailable, a significant proportion of girls sent to Hay were indigenous "Stolen Generation" children. It is possibly the only building in Australia directly associated with the internment of the Dunera Boys and with the imprisonment of the Japanese prisoners of war (POWs) following the Cowra Breakout in 1944. The Hay Gaol is also of State significance for its research, archaeological and interpretive potential as a site or landscape of segregation, which capitalised on the already isolated geographic position of Hay to provide different forms of incarceration in different periods of history.

The Hay Gaol's local historical and social significance as one of several grand buildings that represent Hay's unfulfilled promise of becoming the capital of the Riverina, for its temporary roles as a maternity hospital (1920 to 1930) and as a site of emergency accommodation during the 1952 and 1956 floods and, more recently, for its museum collections relating to the social and pastoral history of Hay. As a substantial building complex sited near the centre of the township, it is an iconic building in Hay.

It is one of a network of five collaboratively managed museums supported by the Hay Shire Council, the Gaol along with Hay's other museums underpin cultural tourism development in the town and as such are important to supporting and diversifying the local economy.

Hay Gaol was listed on the New South Wales State Heritage Register on 13 March 2009 having satisfied the following criteria.

The place is important in demonstrating the course, or pattern, of cultural or natural history in New South Wales.

The Hay Gaol is of State significance for its variety of historical functions as a prison and detention centre. It was built as a colonial prison in 1880 but more significantly was used as a detention and hospitalisation facility servicing Hay's World War II internment and prisoner of war camps (1940 - 1946) and then as a girls' institution run by the NSW Department of Child Welfare (1961 - 1974). The Hay Gaol is of local historical significance as one of several grand buildings that represent Hay's unfulfilled promise of becoming the capital of the Riverina, and for its temporary roles as a maternity hospital (1920 to 1930) and as a site of emergency accommodation during the 1952 and 1956 floods. For its museum collections relating to the social and pastoral history of Hay, the gaol also has local significance.

The place has a strong or special association with a person, or group of persons, of importance of cultural or natural history of New South Wales's history.

The Hay Gaol is of State significance for its historical associations. Designed by the prominent NSW Colonial Architect James Barnet, it is probably the only building in Australia directly associated with the internment of the Dunera Boys and with the imprisonment of the Japanese prisoners of war (POWs) following the Cowra Breakout in 1944. The closure of the girls' institution at Hay and associated institution at Parramatta is associated with the lobbying of child welfare activist Bessie Guthrie. The site has local associative significance as one of many buildings constructed by prolific local builders, the Witcombe Brothers.

The place is important in demonstrating aesthetic characteristics and/or a high degree of creative or technical achievement in New South Wales.

The Hay Gaol is of State significance for its aesthetic values as an example of James Barnet's Hay-type gaol, a classification defined by JS Kerr in his 1988 book, Out of Sight Out of Mind, in which Kerr differentiates Barnet's Hay-type gaol design from the more common Braidwood-type gaol design of the previous colonial architect. It is a relatively intact example of a Victorian country prison that combines foreboding design features - including its entranceway, perimeter walls, cell block and isolation cell - with vernacular materials. Hay Gaol Museum is a substantial building complex sited near the centre of the township that is an iconic building in Hay.

The place has strong or special association with a particular community or cultural group in New South Wales for social, cultural or spiritual reasons.

The Hay Gaol is of State social significance arising from its use as a girls' institution. Although official records remain unavailable, it is believed that a significant proportion of girls sent to Hay were indigenous "stolen generation" children, who constituted many of NSW's most vulnerable of wards of state. Many survivors from this era have begun returning to the site from all over Australia as part of their healing. The Hay Gaol is also of local significance to the many Hay residents who were born there when it was a maternity hospital and to others who lived there when it was emergency flood housing. The Gaol is also of local significance for its use by the community as a museum and cultural facility. The site is used frequently by school groups as part of the Hay Museum Learning Program. As one of a network of five vibrant and collaboratively managed museums supported by the Hay Shire Council the Gaol and Hay's other museums underpin cultural tourism development in the town and as such are important to supporting and diversifying the local economy.

The place has potential to yield information that will contribute to an understanding of the cultural or natural history of New South Wales.

The Hay Gaol is of State significance for its research, archaeological and interpretive potential as a site or landscape of segregation, which capitalised on the already isolated geographic position of Hay to provide different forms of incarceration in different periods of history. For example, the design of the Gaol combines details reflecting Victorian attitudes towards punishment and detention with vernacular construction features such as locally made bricks. It also displays more recent details remaining from when the site was a girls' institution, including concrete patchwork paths laid by the girls and the laundry box used by the girls. The local history of the site to date has been well documented by the Hay Gaol Management Committee and the Hay Historical Society. Additional information about the site's past as a girls' institution is coming to light as survivors start to speak out and return to Hay. It is understood that an examination of government records relating to the site as a girls' institution, when they come available, will yield important information. Likewise a detailed examination of government records relating to the use of the site as an internment camp during World War II will also present new information. Future studies may chronicle the changes to the complex over time and the different ways in which the physical isolation of the town, surrounded by the Hay Plains, added to the segregation effects of the gaol.

The place possesses uncommon, rare or endangered aspects of the cultural or natural history of New South Wales.

The Hay Gaol is of State significance for its rarity as one of only three surviving Hay-type gaols designed by Barnet (of these, Wentworth Gaol has also been converted to a local museum while Tamworth Gaol is still in use by the Department of Corrective Services). The Braidwood-type design of the previous colonial architect was a much more common country gaol design. The Hay Gaol Museum may be found to be of State significance as it is possibly one of only a few substantial buildings remaining statewide relating to the network of World War II Internment and prisoner of war camps in NSW.

The place is important in demonstrating the principal characteristics of a class of cultural or natural places/environments in New South Wales.

The Hay Gaol is of State significance as a relatively intact example of James Barnet's "Hay-type" gaol. This classification, defined by JS Kerr in his 1988 book Out of Sight Out of Mind, is differentiated from the more common Braidwood-type gaol design of the previous colonial architect. It is additionally representative of a particularly harsh response by the NSW Child Welfare Department to the incarceration of young girls.

== See also ==
- Punishment in Australia
- Hay Institution for Girls
- Australian Prisons
