= Newcastle Industrial School for Girls =

- 72 Watt Street, Newcastle, New South Wales; Australia

Information
- Type: industrial school
- Established: 1867
- Closed: 1887 (with transfers to Parramatta Girls Industrial School)
- Gender: Female
- Age range: 10–17

Newcastle Industrial School for Girls (now, Newcastle Government House; 1867–1887) is a defunct Australian girls' school, which was located in 72 Watt Street, Newcastle, New South Wales. On 26 May 1871, the younger girls left the Newcastle Industrial School, and removed to a new institution at Cockatoo Island, named the Biloela Industrial School for Girls. The Newcastle Industrial School for Girls closed in 1887, when all the remaining girls removed to Parramatta Girls School in Parramatta. The building that housed the Newcastle Industrial School for Girls at 72 Watt Street is now the Newcastle Government House.

== History ==
In August 1866, the Act for the Relief of Destitute Children, more commonly known as the Industrial Schools Act, was passed by the Government of NSW under the guidance of Henry Parkes. Children under the age of sixteen could be removed from their family and placed into the care of the government. The Industrial Schools legislation enabled authorities to accommodate, detain and provide training for children under the age of 16 years who were deemed not to be in the control of their parents, in particular those associated with prostitution.

The school was overseen by a superintendent and matron but with the resignation of the first superintendent, G. W. Jackson, who was appointed in early August 1867, before any admissions were made, the matron, Agnes King, was appointed as a matron-superintendent.

The Newcastle Industrial School for Girls admitted its first 12 inmates on 31 August 1867, and within a month, had admitted 30 girls.

Once admitted to an Industrial School a girl was required to stay for a minimum of 12 months. Some were released at younger ages, either returned to their families or guardians or, after 12 months, apprenticed out. In cases of return to families, police checks were conducted in advance to ensure that the child was being sent into a suitable situation. It was a place of detention for girls charged with neglect, wandering, street-trading or being 'uncontrollable'.

By November 1868, the number of children housed had risen to 84 inmates.

On 19 January 1869, the Reformatory School Act resulted in the establishment of a reformatory for girls in the Officers' Barracks on the same site. Between 1867 and 1871, 193 girls and young women were sent to the Industrial School and Reformatory.

By the end of 1870, children under the age of ten were taught the basics of sewing. Girls were tasked with repairing stockings, clothing and linen and also bed ticks, bolster cases and sheets. The more junior girls, aged between 10 and 14, sewed for two hours daily, and the senior girls, over the age of 14, spent three hours daily doing needlework and completing the clothing items expected of the school by the Government.

Agnes Clarke wanted the girls to learn to farm and how to milk a cow so purchased two cows at the cost six pounds on 6 May 1870.

Each Sunday, members of staff escorted girls to local church including Church of England, Christ Church, St John's in Lake Road and St Mary's in Perkin Street. Religious material were given out by the church of England. They had free time on the beach and had community outings to Ash Island and other places around the Hunter.

There were issues with a low staff to inmate ratio of 6 staff to 55 girls. Escapes in 1869, included three girls on 22 December 1867, three girls on 20 June 1868, and two escapes totaling ten girls on 20 November 1868. There were five riots: 9 July 1868, October 1868, 6 January 1871, 10 March 1871 and 19 March 1871. Crowding and an inability to completely segregate both the different age groups and ill inmates within the Industrial School, added to the problems faced by the superintendent as prior to this the building had been used for storage and administration.

Richard Harris, reporting in 1870, identified huge savings in the cost of medicine when comparing expenditure for 1869 and 1870 with costs for 1869 being in excess of £64 and 1870 dropping to just over £8. He had also saved money on milk by purchasing the two cows but he was ordered to sell the cows by the Colonial Secretary. The cost to the government, including staff salaries, was £26 per head. Sydney was not happy with costs created by transferring not only inmates but goods between Sydney and Newcastle with the transfers being done by boat.

The Newcastle Industrial School for Girls closed in 1887, when all the remaining girls removed to Parramatta Girls School in Parramatta. The building that housed the Newcastle Industrial School for Girls at 72 Watt Street has been repurposed as the Newcastle Government House.
