= Roman Catholic Orphan School =

Orphanage

The Roman Catholic Orphan School (RCOS) (1841–1886) was a Government Orphanage built on land adjacent to the third class penitentiary of the Parramatta female factory at Parramatta, NSW Australia, in 1841.

Built from locally quarried ashlar sandstone in the barracks style, the building measured 56 by 22 feet (17.1 m × 6.7 m) and is the only surviving example of the secular work of colonial architect Henry Ginn in NSW. On completion the grounds were walled in, and outhouses placed against them.

The original building was a plain, rather austere colonial Georgian structure consisting of three storeys with a basement where the kitchen, dining room and washrooms were located. In 1843 a three-storey section facing the Governor's Domain was attached to the main building as a residence for the Superintendent, Matron and Teachers.

The orphanage was originally intended to house the children of the Female Factory women, but by 1844 with the transfer of 113 orphans from the Roman Catholic Orphanage at Waverley it became known as the Roman Catholic Orphan School.

Initially run by salaried lay staff with some involvement from the Sisters of Charity, management of the institution was taken over by the Sisters of the Good Shepherd in 1859.

From the outset the orphanage was too small to accommodate the growing numbers of children and several additions were made to the site, mainly between 1843 and 1880, most notably the western and southern outbuildings (1850–1852) which were linked to the main building by a covered walkway, and in 1862 a Hospital with Matron's quarters was built to the south of the main building.

In 1886 the site was reclaimed by the NSW Government and the following year was established as an industrial school for girls.

== See also ==
- Parramatta girls home
- Magdalen Asylum
- Catholic Church sexual abuse cases in Australia
