= Biloela Industrial School for Girls =

- Cockatoo Island, New South Wales; Australia

Information
- Type: industrial school
- Established: 1871 (with transfers from Newcastle Industrial School for Girls)
- Closed: 1887 (with transfers to Parramatta Girls Industrial School)
- Staff: 8
- Gender: Female
- Age range: 10-17

Biloela Industrial School for Girls (1871–1887) was a 19th-century Australian girls' school, situated on Cockatoo Island, New South Wales. Although officially termed an industrial school, it was just as much a reformatory as those located at Coburg or Magill, with this difference, that those girls found in brothels and on the street were sent to Biloela, while criminal girls were committed to Shaftesbury Reformatory for Girls, while Coburg and Magill received both classes. The girls arrived in 1871, having been transferred from Newcastle Industrial School for Girls. In 1887, the girls were transferred once again, this time to more suitable buildings at Parramatta, that being the Parramatta Girls Industrial School.

== History ==
The staff numbered eight including a clerk.

The inmates, who were from age ten upwards, were nominally divided into five classes. The first four classes were allowed all ordinary privileges (pudding, and permission to remain with the teacher until eight o'clock at night being the chief). In addition, the first, second, and third class girls received five shillings, one shilling, and sixpence per month, respectively. The fifth class girls had no privileges, and had to do the hardest work. This classification, however, was apparently only based on awards for good conduct. Classification for separation was not carried out, and the absence of this feature in an institution like Biloela was a very serious defect.

After twelve months residence, the girls were eligible for service. The matron selected the situations, but had to obtain the approval of the Minister of Public Instruction before a girl could be sent out. As a rule, the girls conducted themselves well after leaving the school, and on the whole, reflected credit on the training received.

The number of inmates (89 in 1887) was large. It may be due to this and the unsuitability of the premises, that the institution appeared prison-like in its management, and wanting in vitality.

== Architecture and fittings ==
Biloela Industrial School, although on an island, was enclosed by a high fence. The buildings-which as a whole were very unsuitable for the purposes of a reformatory-were scattered. The workroom, schoolroom, laundry, and others being some distance from each other, and all were away from the dining-room and dormitories. These latter were previously used as a prison, and although they were very cold-looking stone-floored apartments, the general arrangement of them was good, the dormitories and kitchen forming three sides of a square, the dining-room (which was very large and well ventilated) standing alone in the centre of the fourth side.
