= Parramatta Girls Home =

Heritage listed site in New South Wales, Australia

- Established: 1887
- Formerly called: Industrial School for Girls; Girls Training School; Girls Training Home
- Location: Parramatta, New South Wales, Australia
- Dissolved: July 1974

The Parramatta Girls Home, also known as Parramatta Girls Industrial School, Industrial School for Girls, Girls Training School and Girls Training Home, was a state-controlled child-welfare institution located in Parramatta, New South Wales, Australia, which operated from 1887 until 1974.

In 2017 the site became heritage-listed as part of the Parramatta Female Factory and Institutions Precinct.

== History ==
Parramatta Girls Home was established in the former premises of the Roman Catholic Orphan School and was the third in a succession of child-welfare institutions for girls. Australia's first industrial school for girls was established in 1867 in the former military barracks at Newcastle and was known as the Newcastle Industrial School and Reformatory for Girls. In 1871, the Newcastle school closed and the remaining inmates were transferred to a new facility established on Cockatoo Island known as the Biloela Industrial School for Girls, which operated until 1887.

The Parramatta Girls Home served the dual purpose of both a reformatory and training school, with girls committed to the institution on "complaints" under the Child Welfare Act 1939 (NSW) as "delinquent" — uncontrollable, absconding from proper custody, breached probation; "neglected" — exposed to moral danger, no fixed place of abode and destitute, improper guardianship, truant; or "offences juvenile offenders, Crimes Act" — stealing, assaults, robbery, murder, sex offences, malicious damage.

== Disciplinary issues ==
The mixing of these distinct types of individuals within the confines of one institution was problematic for authorities at the time. Authorities realised that innocent girls were being exposed to the corrupting behaviour of others. Attempts to ensure the safety of innocent girls led to the creation of two divisions within the institution. The first was the establishment of a "training home" in the former hospital building near the main site. The training home was in operation from 1912 until around 1926, at which time an alternative site was established at La Perouse, known as both the "Girls Training School" and "Yarra Bay House".

The population of the girls home included many Indigenous girls, mostly those who belong to the Stolen Generations, and was dominated by girls whose families experienced poverty or abuse, or girls who had been orphaned or made state wards at an early age.

While in the home, school-aged girls received minimal education, with most kept occupied in training as domestic servants. The closed operations of the institution, authoritarian rule, daily routine and poor conditions, encouraged a climate of abuse and bullying. In securing their own safety, girls would form allegiances, and, as with the culture in prisons, developed a lover (or kinship) system through exchanged notes, hand-holding, kissing, scratching initials into their body and secret codes — ILWA (I love worship adore/always), or TID (till I die), or SML — used to express affection. With the arrival or discharge of girls, new allegiances were developed, often causing petty jealousies and disputes. A rebuffed girl would often resort to a form of retaliation called "dogging" or a "top off", meaning that she would report her rival to an officer for a breach of rules.

Riots occurred frequently, with the first officially investigated one taking place in 1889. Other riots occurred during the 1940s, in 1958, and 1961, with most attributed to the treatment that the girls were receiving. Until 1961, girls who had committed a "secondary" (institutional) offence, called "conduct to the prejudice of good order and discipline", were sent to Long Bay Prison for three months. This arrangement changed in July 1961, when the Hay Institution for Girls was established as a maximum security annex of Parramatta Girls Home.

Numerous male staff, and occasionally other girls, were said to have physically and sexually abused the inmates. A public hearing heard evidence about 11 men, most of whom were superintendents or deputies at Parramatta Girls. These men were entrusted with the girls' care but witnesses spoke of regular bashings, rapes, and assaults. Most of the alleged perpetrators were never reported or investigated. Others resigned or were dismissed after inquiries into their conduct. No criminal charges were laid on the alleged perpetrators.

== Closure ==
Parramatta Girls Home was officially closed in July 1974, but continued to operate as a welfare institution under a new name, "Kamballa" and "Taldree". In 1980, the Department of Corrective Services took over the main buildings and was subsequently operated as the Norma Parker Detention Centre for Women.

Most of the site was vacant in 2014, when it was reported that the site would be considered for the National Heritage List, after a nomination from a group of former inmates in 2011. In 2017 it became part of the Parramatta Female Factory and Institutions Precinct, a listed place.

== Inquiries and apologies ==
A 2004 Senate Inquiry by the Community Affairs References Committee included statements by twenty former residents of the Parramatta Girls Home about their experiences there.

The Australian Prime Minister Kevin Rudd gave a formal apology to the Stolen Generations in February 2008.

The Royal Commission into Institutional Responses to Child Sexual Abuse heard in 2014 from sixteen women who made statements that during their time at the Parramatta Girls Home they were subjected to sexual and physical abuse.

== See also ==
- Catholic Church sexual abuse cases in Australia
- Cootamundra Domestic Training Home for Aboriginal Girls
- Juvenile Justice NSW
- Magdalene Asylum
- Punishment in Australia
- St Heliers Correctional Centre
- Stolen Generations
- Bessie Guthrie
