= Punishment in Australia =

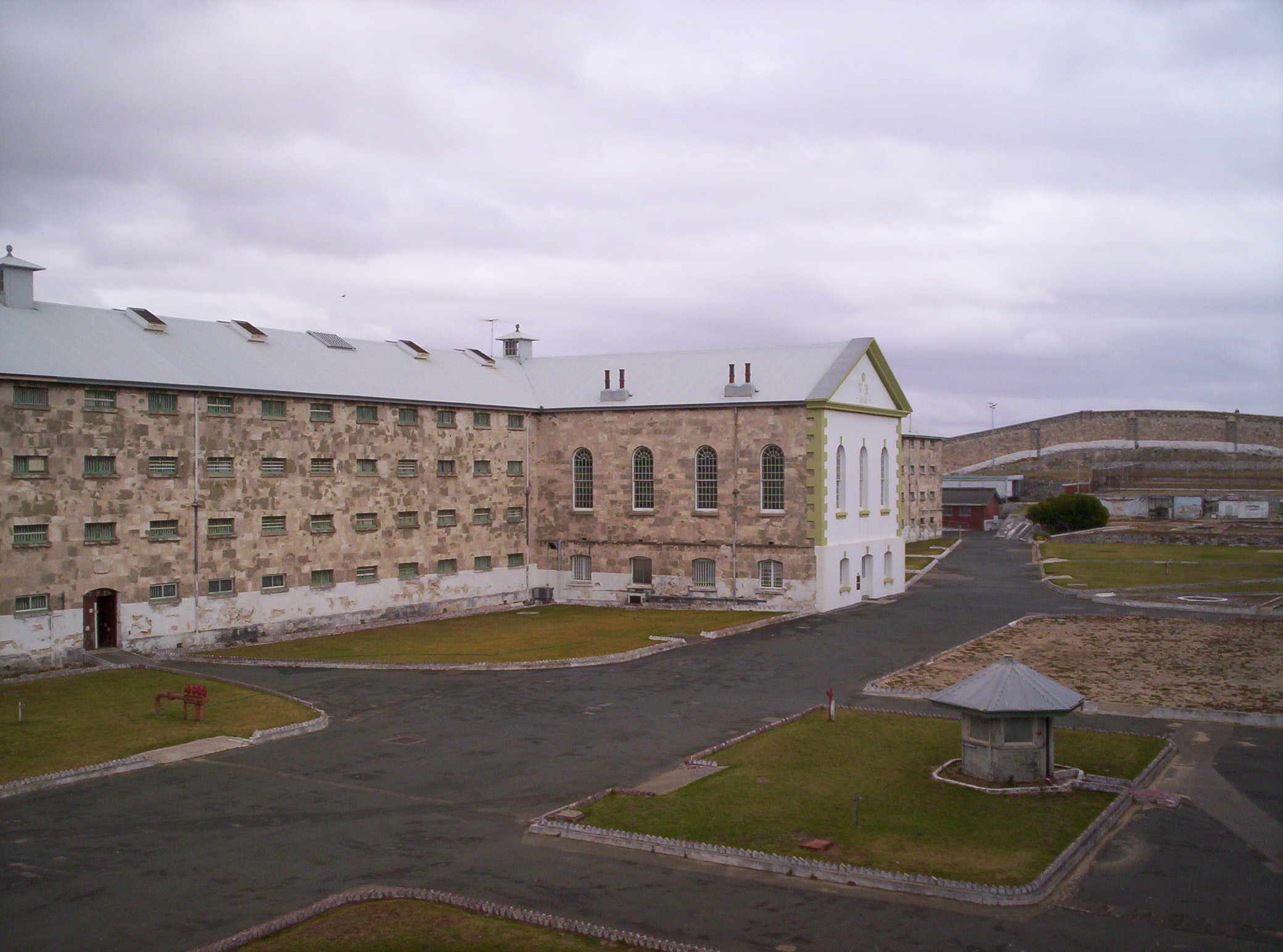
The main cell block of old Fremantle Prison

Punishment in Australia arises when an individual has been accused or convicted of breaking the law through the Australian criminal justice system. Australia uses prisons, as well as community corrections (various non-custodial punishments such as parole, probation, community service etc.). When awaiting trial, prisoners may be kept in specialised remand centres or within other prisons.

The death penalty has been abolished, and corporal punishment is no longer used. Prison labour occurs in Australia, with prisoners involved in many types of paid work. Before the colonisation of Australia by Europeans, Indigenous Australians had their own traditional punishments, some of which are still practised. The most severe punishment by law which can be imposed in Australia is life imprisonment. In the most extreme cases of murder, and some severe sex offences, such as aggravated rape, courts in the states and territories can impose life imprisonment without parole, thus ordering the convicted person to spend the rest of their life in prison.

Prisons in Australia are operated by state-based correctional services departments, for the detention of minimum, medium, maximum and supermax security prisoners convicted in state and federal courts, as well as prisoners on remand. In the June quarter of 2024, there were 44,403 adults imprisoned in Australia, which represents an incarceration rate of 208 prisoners per 100,000 adult population, or 172 per 100,000 total population. This represents a sharp increase from previous decades. In 2016-2017 the prison population was not representative of the Australian population, for example, 91% of prisoners were male, while males were only half of the population, and 27% of prisoners were Aboriginal or Torres Strait Islanders, while Indigenous people were only 2.8% of the population. In 2018, 18.4% of prisoners in Australia were held in private prisons.

In the 2016-17 financial year, Australia spent $3.1 billion on prisons and $0.5 billion on community corrections.

Australia also detains non-citizens in a separate system of immigration detention centres, operated by the federal Department of Home Affairs, pending their deportation and to prevent them from entering the Australian community. Controversially this includes the detention of asylum seekers, including children, while their claims to be refugees are determined. In 2023, the High Court of Australia ruled that indefinite detention was unconstitutional if the detainees had no foreseeable prospect of deportation (for instance stateless individuals). The court stated that in such cases indefinite detention amounted to punishment, which is the purview of the courts - not the executive government. It has been stated the different purposes make little practical difference between immigration detention and imprisonment, and that detainees often experience immigration detention as if it were punishment.

== History ==
=== Traditional Indigenous punishments ===
Prior to the arrival of Europeans, the Indigenous people of Australia - Aboriginals and Torres Strait Islanders - had their own traditional punishments which they carried out on people who broke tribal customary law. These included:

- Spearing - a corporal punishment where someone is pierced with a spear, often through their leg.
- Singing - an elder sings, which is believed to call evil spirits/misfortune upon the offender. There are reports of this happening as recently as 2016.
- Duelling
- Public shaming
- Compensation - such as by adoption or marriage.
- Exclusion from the community
- Death - this could be either directly through execution, or indirectly through magic.

=== Colonial times ===
New South Wales, as the founding site for British colonisation Australia in 1788, has had prisons for as long as Australia has had European settlement. The first Australian colony was founded at Port Jackson (now Sydney) on 26 January 1788, and marked the commencement of many decades of convict arrivals from the United Kingdom. Penal colonies were also founded in what is now the states of Queensland, Tasmania, and Western Australia.

Two penal colonies were briefly founded in the area that is now Victoria. Both were abandoned shortly after. Later, after a free settlement had been established, some convicts were transported to the region.

No penal colonies were located in the areas that have now become South Australia, the Northern Territory and the Australian Capital Territory.

Norfolk Island (an external territory of Australia), the site of two penal colonies from 1788–1814 and 1824-1856, has no prisons at all in the 21st century. When Glenn McNeill was sentenced in 2007 to 24 years in prison for murder on Norfolk Island, the absence of prisons meant he was imprisoned in NSW.

Convicts in the 19th century were subject to forced hard labour, such as quarrying sandstone. William Ulthorne, an English Catholic Bishop described convict labourers in the 1830s: “They are fettered with heavy chains, harassed with heavy work, and fed on salt meat and coarse bread, [...] Their faces are awful to behold, and their existence one of desperation.”

Additionally, there was the punishment of young children. John Hudson was reportedly only nine years old when sentenced for burglary and 13 when transported to Australia. He was one of 34 children on the First Fleet in 1788.

=== Capital punishment in Australia ===
On 3 February 1967 Ronald Ryan was the last individual to be executed in Australia after he killed a prison officer whilst attempting to escape Pentridge Prison. A few years later the Federal Parliament passed the Death Penalty Abolition Act 1973, abolishing the death penalty amongst federal law however not prohibiting its use in state or territory law.

The various states and territories all formally legally abolished capital punishment in their laws, with the first being Queensland in 1922 and the last being New South Wales in 1985.

The International Covenant on Civil and Political Rights (ICCPR) is a multilateral treaty outlining the obligations of its parties to respect and promote the civil and political rights of individuals. Article 6 of the ICCPR states the death penalty may only be used in countries that have not abolished capital punishment for the severest of crimes. The Second Optional Protocol to the ICCPR was created as an accompaniment to the ICCPR and altered Article 6 to ensure the abolishment of the death penalty in all cases worldwide.

In Australia the second optional protocol to the ICCPR has been signed and ratified into domestic law. This is seen through the Crimes Legislation Amendment (Torture Prohibition and Death Penalty Abolition) Act 2010. The act fully abolished the death penalty and effectively ensured no state or territory is able to reintroduce it.

=== Corporal punishment in Australia ===
Flogging (also called whipping, lashing), a form of corporal punishment, was used from 1788 up until 1958. The Australian folk ballad Jim Jones at Botany Bay, dated to the early 19th century, is written from the perspective of a convict wanting to take revenge on those who flogged him. The last men flogged in Australia were William John O'Meally and John Henry Taylor, at Pentridge Prison, Victoria on 1 April 1958 (technically William was flogged second, and so was the last).

As of August 2020, the Global Initiative to End All Corporal Punishment of Children reports that "Prohibition is still to be achieved in the home in all states/territories and in alternative care settings, day care, schools and penal institutions in some states/territories".

Corporal punishment of school children is legally banned in public schools nationwide, but remains legal in private schools in Queensland.

== Adult imprisonment ==
Each state and territory runs its own department to oversee correctional services; for example the South Australian Department for Correctional Services is responsible for prisoners and the provision of the rehabilitation opportunities in South Australia.

=== Number of prisoners ===
Prison population of Australia over time
Year	Number	Rate (per 100k adults)	Ref.
1982	9,826	90	
1983	10,196	92	
1984	10,844	86	
1985	10,196	94	
1986	11,497	98	
1987	12,113	101	
1988	12,321	100	
1989	10,196	103	
1990	12,965; 14,305	112	
1991	15,021	116	
1992	15,559	118	
1993	15,866	119	
1994	16,944	125	
1995	17,428	127	
1996	18,193	126; 131	
1997	19,082	130; 134	
1998	18,692; 19,906	133; 139	
1999	20,609	144	
2000	21,714	148	
2001	22,458	151	
2002	22,492	148	
2003	23,555	153	
2004	23,149	151	
2005	24,392	157	
2006	24,762	158	
2007	25,801	163	
2008	27,615	169	
2009	29,317	175	
2010	29,700	170	
2011	29,106	167	
2012	29,383	168	
2013	30,775	170	
2014	33,791	186	
2015	36,134	196	
2016	38,845	208	
2017	41,202	216	
2018	42,974	221	
2019	43,028	219	
2020	41,060	205	
2021	42,970	214	
2022	40,591	201	
2023	41,925	202	
2024	44,403	208	

In June 2022, there were 40,591 people imprisoned in Australia, and an incarceration rate of 201 prisoners per 100,000 adult population.

In the 30 years from 1988 to 2018, Australia's incarceration rate per 100,000 adults more than doubled. However, since 2018 it has decreased. The highest rate of increase was seen among prisoners on remand (ie: unsentenced, awaiting trial or sentencing), women and Indigenous Australians. From 2012 to 2017 the number of people in prison on remand grew 87 percent. This might be due to more people being refused bail, and a backlog of cases in the courts.

=== Males ===
In 2017 males made up 91.9% of prisoners, despite males only being roughly half the adult population.

=== Females ===
The number of female prisoners in Australia rose 47% between 2009 and 2019. They are often victims of crime themselves, such as domestic violence and assault. The majority are jailed for relatively minor, non-violent crimes which are often related to poverty and homelessness. In addition, Aboriginal and Torres Strait Islander women and women with disabilities are disproportionately represented in the statistics. Until amendments to legislation were introduced in 2020, many women in Western Australia were imprisoned for non-payment of fines. The amendments were partly the result of recommendations of the coronial inquest into the death of Ms Dhu, who died in police custody.

In 2021 the female imprisoned population in Australia was 7.7% of the total adults who are incarcerated. The percentage of the total female prison population rose from 7.2% of the population in 2000 to 12.8% in 2021 (from 1,385 to 3,302 per 100,000), based on the national population (with these figures approximately doubling if based on the national female population).

Debbie Kilroy, founder of Sisters Inside, is a well-known advocate for prison reform for female prisoners, who has noted several ways in which the current criminal justice system has failed in its mission to punish and rehabilitate women.

=== Indigenous Australians ===
From 2008 to 2017 there was an increase in the rate of Indigenous people imprisoned, from 1.8% of the Aboriginal and Torres Strait Islander population to 2.43%.

In 2017, Indigenous people were over 15 times more likely than non-Indigenous people to be imprisoned. As of June 2022, the total Aboriginal and Torres Strait Islander population in Australia aged 18 years and over was approximately 2%, while Indigenous prisoners accounted for 32 percent of the adult prison population. As of August 2022, 40 per cent of women in prison in the state of New South Wales are Indigenous women.

The attorney-general for Australia commissioned the Australian Law Reform Commission (ALRC) in October 2016 to examine the factors leading to the disproportionate numbers of Aboriginal and Torres Strait Islander peoples in Australian prisons, and to look at ways of reforming legislation which might ameliorate this "national tragedy". The result of this in-depth enquiry was a report titled Pathways to Justice – Inquiry into the Incarceration Rate of Aboriginal and Torres Strait Islander Peoples, which was received by the attorney-general in December 2017 and tabled in Parliament on 28 March 2018. The report listed 13 recommendations, covering many aspects of the legal framework and police and justice procedures, including that fine default should not result in the imprisonment.

Various programs in New South Wales have been having a positive effect on keeping Indigenous people out of prison. In Bourke, a project called Maranguka Justice Reinvestment has police officers meeting with local Indigenous leaders each day, helping to identify at-risk youth, and includes giving free driving lessons to young people. There have been reductions in domestic violence and juvenile offending (such as driving without a license), and an increase in school retention. Project Walwaay in Dubbo sees an Aboriginal youth team help to build relationships and engage young people in activities on a Friday night, which is now the second lowest day of crime, compared with being the busiest day before. The activities are also a pathway to the Indigenous Police Recruitment Delivery Our Way (IPROWD), an 18-week program run through TAFE NSW, which encourages young people to become police officers. This was first run in Dubbo in 2008 and has now been expanded to other locations across the state. Since 2021, yarning circles have been introduced in men's and women's prisons across NSW, starting with Broken Hill Correctional Centre, in a bid to connect Indigenous inmates with their culture, and reduce reoffending and the high rates of incarceration of Aboriginal and Torres Strait Islander people.

=== State and territory prison populations ===
According to the Australian Bureau of Statistics, as of June 2022, the number of adult prisoners according to each state and territory were as follows:

Adult Prisoner Statistics Per State/Territory (June 2022)
State/territory	Number of prisoners	Percent change From June 2021	Percent male	Percent female	Percent Aboriginal and Torres Strait Islander
New South Wales	12,372	-6	93.4	6.6	29.1
Victoria	6,569	-9	94.7	5.2	10.6
Queensland	9,376	-6	90.9	9.1	36.4
South Australia	3,049	-2	93.1	7.0	24.4
Western Australia	6,276	-7	91.0	8.9	40.2
Tasmania	630	-2	92.9	6.8	22.7
Northern Territory	1,934	+8	93.9	5.9	87.0†
Australian Capital Territory	381	+1	94.5	5.5	25.2

†Note that Indigenous Australians make up 25% of the Northern Territory's population, compared to under 5% in all other states and territories, and 2.8% nationally.

=== State and territory incarceration rates ===
As of June 2022, the Northern Territory had by the country's highest incarceration rate at 1,027 per 100,000 adult population, which is over five times the incarceration rate of the country overall and an increase from 2017, when the territory's incarceration rate was 878 per 100,000. With the exception of the Northern Territory and Queensland, all other states and territories saw a decrease in incarceration rate over the same time period.

Incarceration Rate by State/Territory (June 2022)
State/Territory	Incarceration rate
New South Wales	195
Victoria	127
Queensland	229
South Australia	212
Western Australia	293
Tasmania	138
Northern Territory	1,027
Australian Capital Territory	107

=== By crime ===
The Australia Bureau of Statistics classifies prisoners (sentenced and unsentenced) according to the "most serious" crime with which they are charged. In 2022, statistics for charges were as follows:

- Acts intended to cause injury: 10,557 individuals (26.0% of all prisoners)
- Sexual assault and related offences: 6,446 (15.9%)
- Illicit drug offences: 5,515 (13.6%)
- Unlawful entry with intent: 3,305 (8.1%)
- Homicide: 3,257 (8.0%)
- Offences against justice procedures: 2,891 (7.1%)
- Robbery/extortion: 2,586 (6.4%)

Federal prisoners

Federal prisoners are persons sentenced under commonwealth (federal) law, or transferred from another country to serve their sentence in Australia. In June 2022 there were 1,390 federal prisoners serving sentences in Australia.

=== Place of birth ===
Overall, foreign-born people are less likely to be imprisoned than people born in Australia. In 2017, foreign-born people were 35% of the adult population, but only 18% of the prison population.

The incarceration rate differed depending on country of birth. People born in Australia, New Zealand, Vietnam, Lebanon, Iran, Iraq, Somalia, Sudan, South Sudan, Samoa, Afghanistan and Tonga all had incarceration rates higher than the national average. Meanwhile people born in China, Hong Kong, India, Sri Lanka, Philippines, South Africa, United States, United Kingdom, Canada, Italy, Turkey, Greece, Germany, Taiwan, South Korea and Fiji had incarceration rates lower than the national average.

However, these rates are not age-standardised, meaning they do not account for the fact that different groups tend to be younger or older on average. This matters, because teenagers and young adults are much more likely to commit crime than older adults. For instance the Sudanese-born population tends to be much younger on average, and this can help to explain their over-representation in the prison population.

=== Life imprisonment in Australia ===
In Australia, life imprisonment is of indeterminate length. The sentencing judge usually sets a non-parole period after which the prisoner can apply for release under parole conditions, or in the case of a criminal who has committed particularly heinous crimes, the sentencing judge may order that the person is "never to be released".

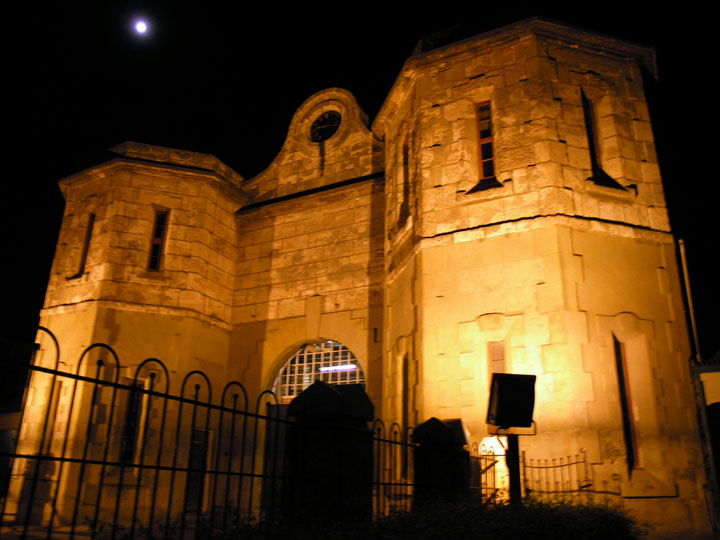
The gatehouse of Fremantle Prison

== Prisons ==
=== High-security prisons ===
For extremely high-risk offenders, Australia operates several supermax prisons.

=== Private prisons ===
History and statistics

In 2018, 18.4% of prisoners in Australia were held in private prisons.

Modern prison privatisation began in the U.S. and Australia followed shortly thereafter. On 2 January 1990, Borallon Correctional Centre opened as the first private prison in Australia, located in Queensland. Borallon was managed by the Corrections Company of Australia (which was owned by John Holland Group, Wormald International and Corrections Corporation of America). In 2007 Serco won the bid to take over the prison. In 2012 Borallon closed. In 2016 it reopened as a government-operated prison.

In 1992, the Arthur Gorrie Correctional Centre opened, as the second private prison in Queensland, managed by GEO Group Australia.

In 1993, New South Wales became the second Australian state to privatise prisons after Queensland, when Junee Correctional Centre was opened.

As of November 2018, there were no private prisons located in Tasmania, the Northern Territory or the Australian Capital Territory.

Violence and overcrowding

In June 2018, an investigation by the ABC revealed high rates of inmate violence, prison guard brutality and overcrowding at Arthur Gorrie Correctional Centre in Queensland. At that time, the contract for the prison was up for tender. In 2016, the rate of prisoner assault at the prison was more than double the next highest prison.

Arguments for and against

A 2016 article by Anastasia Glushko (a former worker in the private prison sector) argues in favour of privately operated prisons in Australia. According to Glushko, private prisons in Australia have decreased the costs of holding prisoners and increased positive relationships between inmates and correctional workers. Outsourcing prison services to private companies has allowed for costs to be cut in half. Compared with $270 a day in a government-run West Australian jail, each prisoner in the privately operated Acacia facility near Perth costs the taxpayer $182. Glushko also says that positive prisoner treatment was observed during privatisation in Australia by including more respectful attitudes to prisoners and mentoring schemes, increased out-of-cell time and more purposeful activities. As Australia’s prison population has grown and existing facilities have aged, public-private partnerships have provided opportunities to build new correctional centers while enabling governments to defer much needed cash flow. Glushko points out that at Ravenhall Prison in Victoria, the operator is compensated on the basis of the recidivism rate, and this strategy may make the operator more concerned about the wellbeing of its inmates after prison which in return would benefit the entire Australian correctional system.

Conversely, a 2016 report from the University of Sydney found that in general, all states of Australia lacked a comprehensive approach to hold private prisons accountable to the government. The authors said that of all the states, Western Australia had the "most developed regulatory approach" to private prison accountability, as they had learnt from the examples in Queensland and Victoria. Western Australia provided much information about the running of private prisons in the state to the public, making it easier to assess performance. However the authors note that in spite of this, overall it is difficult to compare the performance and costs of private and public prisons as they often house different kinds and numbers of prisoners, in different states with different regulations. They note that Acacia Prison, sometimes held up as an example of how private prisons can be well run, cannot serve as a general example of prison privatisation.

Additionally, community corrections orders have been argued to be cheaper and equally as effective as public or private incarceration. See the section on community corrections for more details.

List of private prisons in Australia

Private prisons in Australia, June 2019
Private prison	State or territory	Operating company
Mount Gambier Prison	South Australia	G4S
Port Phillip Prison	Victoria	G4S
Fulham Correctional Centre	Victoria	GEO Group Australia
Parklea Correctional Centre	New South Wales	MTC-Broadspectrum
Junee Correctional Centre	New South Wales	GEO Group Australia
Ravenhall Prison	Victoria	GEO Group Australia
Acacia Prison	Western Australia	Serco

Former private prisons

- Borallon Correctional Centre (QLD) - Australia's first private prison, currently a government operated prison.
- Wandoo Reintegration Facility (WA) - Opened in 2012 on former site of Rangeview Juvenile Remand Centre. Managed by Serco until 2018 when it came back into public hands. Now a women's drug rehabilitation facility.
- Arthur Gorrie Correctional Centre (QLD) - Management transitioned to Queensland Corrective Services in 2020.
- Southern Queensland Correctional Centre (QLD) - Private management contract with Serco was revoked as a result of higher levels of assaults, with Queensland Corrective Services taking over control in July 2021.

=== Cost of prisons in Australia ===
In 2016-17, Australia spent A$3.1 billion on prisons.

== Youth imprisonment ==
The age of criminal responsibility in Australia is 10 years old, meaning children under 10 cannot be charged with a crime. In 2018, law experts called for the age to be raised to 16 and the various Attorneys General decided to investigate the matter. Calls to increase the minimum age have increased in recent years. Doctors, lawyers, and a range of experts have called for the minimum age to be raised to 14. Among other bodies, the Australian Human Rights Commission has submitted a report to the Council of Attorneys-General Age of Criminal Responsibility Working Group.

In August 2020, the Legislative Assembly of the ACT passed a motion that indicated in-principle support for increasing the age of criminal responsibility to 14 in line with UN standards, a move welcomed by Indigenous advocates. In November 2023, the Legislative Assembly passed the Justice (Age of Criminal Responsibility) Legislation Amendment Act 2023, which raised the age of criminal responsibility to twelve years of age as of the 22nd of that month, and fourteen as of 1 July 2025.

=== Statistics ===
According to a 2018 SBS article, around 600 children under 14 are locked up in Australian prisons each year.

On an average night in June 2019, there were 949 minors imprisoned in Australia. Of these:

- 90% were male;
- 83% were aged 10–17 (the remainder 18–20);
- 63% were unsentenced;
- 53% were Aboriginal and/or Torres Strait Islander youth.

In the year ending 30 June 2020, there were almost 600 children aged 10 to 13 in detention in Australia.

From June 2015 to 2019, the Northern Territory had the highest rate of young people in detention on average per night in Australia, at 22 out of every 10,000 youth aged 10-17.

=== Abuse in juvenile prisons ===
In 2016 the ABC aired a Four Corners report which revealed abuse of youth occurring at Don Dale Youth Detention Centre in the Northern Territory. This included an incident where, in 2015, Dylan Voller, then a minor, had his face covered with a spit hood and was strapped into a mechanical restraint chair for 2 hours. As a result the Australian government established the Royal Commission into the Protection and Detention of Children in the Northern Territory.

In 2022, a Tasmanian Government inquiry revealed that 55 workers at Ashley Youth Detention Centre had been accused of child sex abuse by former child detainees. One former worker was accused of abusing 11 children over the course of 3 decades. Another former staff member was accused of using sexual violence and intimidation, including forced masturbation, against 26 former child detainees. The alleged crimes span from recent years back to the 1970s. In September 2021, it was announced that Ashley Youth Detention Centre would close within three years, and be replaced by two new facilities.

== Deaths in custody ==
In 2013-2015, there were 149 deaths in custody in Australia, the majority occurred in prison while a minority occurred in police custody. The majority of prisoners who died in prison and police custody were male, over 40 years of age and non-Indigenous. For deaths in immigration detention, see the section on immigration detention facilities.

Deaths in custody in Australia, 2013-2015
Type of custody	Total number	Male	Female	Aged 40+	Aboriginal and Torres Strait Islander
Police	34	88%	12%	56%	19%
Prison	115	97%	3%	79%	22%

=== Aboriginal and Torres Strait Islander deaths ===
Indigenous Australians are highly over-represented among deaths in custody, they were only 3.2% of the general population in 2021. This led the government to establish a Royal Commission into Aboriginal Deaths in Custody in 1987, which delivered its report in 1991. However, in general there has been a lack of action on reports into deaths, including a failure to implement the recommendations of the 1987 royal commission, and Indigenous deaths in custody remain disproportionately high as a proportion of the general population.

From 2008 to 2018, 56% of Indigenous people who died in custody had not been found guilty. They were on remand, died while fleeing police or during arrest, or were in protective custody. A majority were suspected of non-indictable offences, which typically carry sentences of less than five years.

=== Police custody deaths ===
Of the 34 deaths that occurred in police custody in 2013-2015, 50% resulted from gunshot wounds. Of those, 13 were police shootings while 4 were self-inflicted.

7 of the 34 occurred during motor vehicle pursuits, while 6 occurred in sieges and 2 in raids. 10 were listed as "other".

From 1989-1991 until now, people aged 25–39 have been overall the most represented group in police deaths, followed by people aged under 25, then 40-54 year olds, then people aged 55+. However, as noted above, in 2013-2015 the majority of deaths were people aged over 40. Furthermore from 1989-1990 to 2014-2015, the overall most common situation for deaths in police custody to occur, was during a motor vehicle pursuit.

=== Prison deaths ===
7/10 prison deaths were due to natural causes, and 1/3 of those were due to heart disease. The rate of deaths per 100,000 prisoners was 0.16 for sentenced prisoners (ie prisoners who were convicted and serving a sentence) and 0.18 for unsentenced prisoners (ie: in prison awaiting trial).

Deaths in prison custody in Australia, 2013-2015, by sentence status and cause
Sentence status	Natural causes	Hanging	External/multiple trauma	Alcohol and other drugs	Other
Sentenced	83%	10%	4%	2%	1%
Unsentenced	39%	57%	0%	4%	0%

In 1979-1980, there were only 15 deaths in prison custody. This increased until in 1997-1998 there were 80 deaths in prison custody. Deaths then decreased sharply to 28 in 2005-2006, before rising again to 54 in 2013-2014 and 61 in 2014-2015. In the late 1990s there was a large disparity between the rate of death (per 100,000 prisoners) for sentenced and unsentenced prisoners, peaking at 1.18 for unsentenced prisoners to 0.28 for sentenced.

Prison deaths by state/territory:

Deaths in prison custody in Australia, 2013-2015, by state/territory
State/territory	Prison deaths	Percent of national prison deaths
New South Wales	34	29.5%
Victoria	26	22.6%
Queensland	18	15%
Western Australia	11	9.5%
South Australia	11	9.5%
Tasmania	4	3.47%
Northern Territory	8	6.95%
Australian Capital Territory	3	2.6%

=== Deaths in immigration detention ===
From 2000 to 2018 there have been dozens of deaths in immigration detention, many from suicide. Additionally, some people have died after being released, for reasons connected with being detained.

== Prison labour ==
Prisoners in Australia are expected to work while in custody. Inmates typically earn between $0.80 and $3.00 per hour. No prison worker is paid superannuation, and their employers do not pay payroll tax. Prison workers are not legally considered workers, and as such are not entitled to workers' compensation if injured.

Victoria

In Victoria prisoners fabricate metal and make timber products. Both male and female inmates also pack airline headsets for Qantas. Other jobs for female prisoners include sewing Australian flags and making bed linen.

In August 2026, the Victorian Labor Government proposed to put prisoners to work fixing potholes on Victoria's roads. Premier Ben Carroll said that if re-elected (in November 2026), his government would put prisoners to work mowing grass, controlling weeds, removing graffiti and picking up rubbish beside roads. Carroll said the prisoners would be under the supervision of Corrections Victoria, and claimed this would not take any paid jobs away from non-prisoners.

Queensland

In Queensland inmates make tents, chairs, coffee tables, doonas and doors. Female prisoners cut up used clothes to turn into rags.

New South Wales

In New South Wales, prisoner work is organised by Corrective Service Industries (CSI), an arm of the state justice department. Prisoners sew national and state flags and ambulance flags, and paint boomerangs. CSI said in 2017 that 84.9% of NSW inmates who can work, do so. In 2017, NSW prisoners were paid from $24.60 to $70.55 for a 30-hour work week. This is about $0.82 to $2.35 per hour, compared to the Australian minimum wage of $17.70 per hour. CSI made $113 million revenue and $46.6 million profit in 2016. CSI said that prison work helped prisoners pass time, and that 1% of their sales went to the Victims Compensation Levy (a government compensation fund for crime victims).

In 2019, about 20 prisoners at Dawn De Loas Correctional Centre were assembling computers. The identity of the company using this labour was unknown, but CSI overseer Jasvinder Oberai said that the program provided inmates with work experience, that PC parts came from government donations and the assembled PCs were given back to government departments.

Northern Territory

In the Northern Territory, prison labour is overseen by Northern Territory Correctional Industries (NTCI) and their advisory panel.

In 2015, NTCI made $20 revenue and $2 million profit. In 2016, concerns were raised that prison labour in the NT was competing unfairly with private businesses and taking jobs away from free people. NT lawmaker Robyn Lambley said "we have been told numerous times that the products that are made by NTCI are sold at a competitive price in the open market. But you're not paying all the overheads of employing people; you're not paying superannuation, you're not paying insurance, you're not paying payroll tax, you're not paying all those expenses associated with employing someone and that is a big saving." The NT Corrections Commissioner Mark Payne denied that prison labour is competing with local businesses, and that if they think they are competing, they stop doing that work.

In 2013, NT prisoners were working at a salt mine in remote center of the NT. The prisoners earned about $16 per hour, compared to $35 for a regular union employee. 5% of earnings went to the Victims Compensation Fund and some funds were deducted for board, and the prisoners had $60 spending money per week. The mining union United Voice said that this was akin to "slave labour", that these workers were undercutting other workers, and that if anyone is working in the mines they should be paid at a market rate. Territory Correctional Services Minister John Elferink said the work provided inmates with valuable work experience, because otherwise they would be sitting in a "concrete box".

== Non-prison punishments ==
=== Community corrections ===
Community corrections is the term used for various punishments and court orders in Australia that do not involve prison time. Types of community corrections include:

- Home detention
- Suspended sentence
- Good behaviour bond
- Community service order
- Parole
- Non-conviction bond - where a person is found guilty, but does not get a criminal record provided they go for a certain period without committing another crime

Statistics

In the June 2018, there were 69,397 people in community corrections, an increase of 1,406 (4%) from June 2017. 55,867 (81%) were male and all of the remainder were female (Australia allows people to legally register as X/third gender on some identity documents).

In June 2013 there were 57,354 people in community corrections. From 2013 to 2018, females serving community corrections orders increased by 40% compared to males by 26%.

In June 2006, there were 52,212 persons in community-based corrections in Australia.

In June 2018 most common type of community corrections orders were, in order:

- Sentenced probation
- Parole
- Community service

Please note that people may receive two or more different corrections orders at the same time.

Cost and effectiveness

In 2016-2017 financial year, Australia spent $500 million ($0.5 billion) Australian dollars on community corrections.

An article in The Age, citing a report by the Institute of Public Affairs (a conservative think tank) as well as other figures, said community correctional orders are argued to be significantly cheaper than the cost of private or public incarceration (roughly 10% of the cost of putting people behind bars), "16 per cent of offenders who completed a CCO returned to corrective services within two years" compared to the nearing 50% in traditional prisons. Community-correctional orders CCOs are increasingly commonplace in Victoria and show that crime rates can be meaningfully affected.

Additionally, a June 2018 report from the Australian Institute of Criminology also found that in the short term, for a certain kind of prisoner (comprising roughly 15% of prisoners in Victoria), dealing with them via community corrections orders had similar outcomes to prison but was 9 times cheaper.

=== Other non-prison punishments ===
These include:

- Monetary fines
- Confiscation of property (eg: impounding cars used in offences, confiscating contraband) etc.
- Apprehended violence order (a type of injunction or restraining order)

== Former prisons ==
=== Prison museums ===
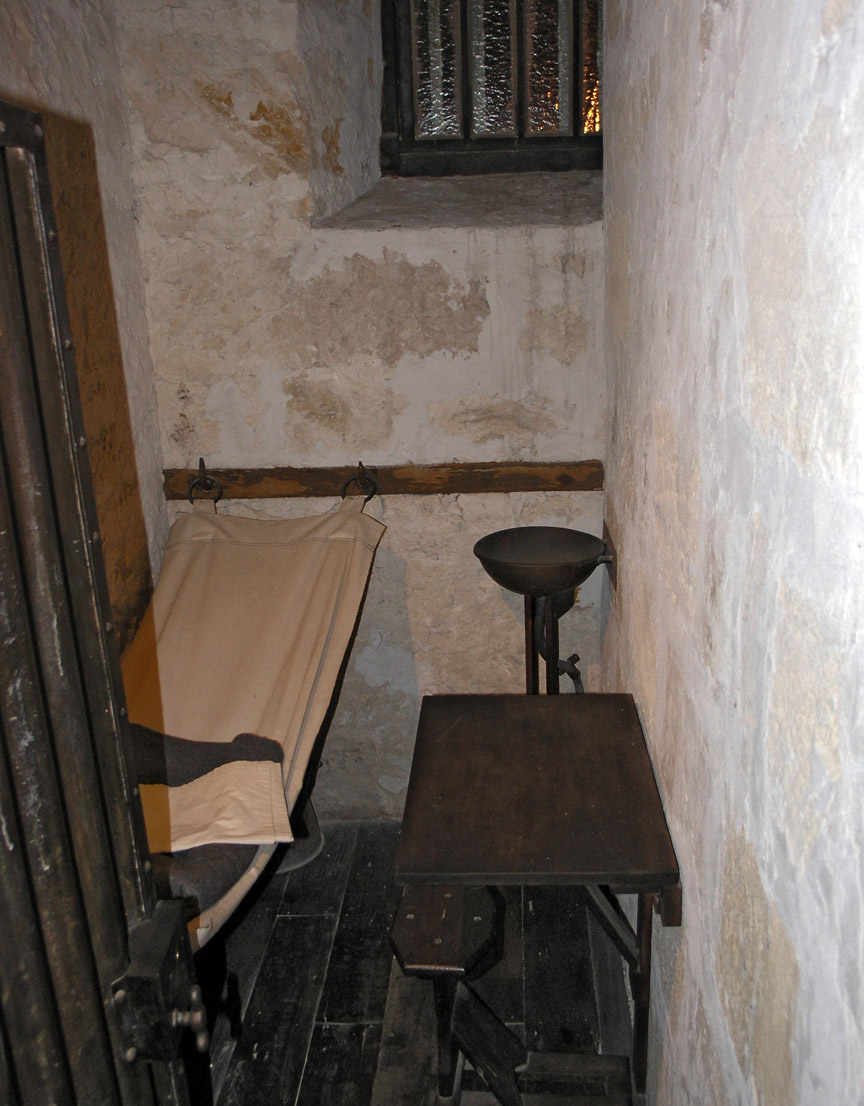
A recreation 1855 cell in Fremantle Prison

Former Australian prisons which are now open to the public as museums.

- Old Dubbo Gaol
- Boggo Road Gaol
- Fremantle Prison
- Fannie Bay Gaol
- Gladstone Gaol
- J Ward
- HM Prison Geelong
- Adelaide Gaol
- Mount Gambier Gaol
- Redruth Gaol
- Maitland Gaol
- Wentworth Gaol
- Old Melbourne Gaol
- HM Prison Beechworth

=== Other former prisons ===
- HM Prison Fairlea
- HM Prison Geelong
- HM Prison Sale
- HM Prison Morwell River
- HM Prison Pentridge

== Cultural depictions ==
Many films and television shows have depicted the punishment of early convicts and bushrangers in Australia.

Television

- Prisoner was a soap opera which ran from 1979 until 1986 and depicted life in a fictional women's prison in Australia.
- Wentworth is a drama that started broadcasting in 2013. It is a contemporary re-imagining of Prisoner.
- Underbelly is a drama series which depicts the lives of Australian criminals, including many prison scenes.

Film

- Stir is a 1980 prison film written by former prisoner Bob Jewson, based on his own experiences.
- Ghosts of the Civil Dead is a 1988 drama film set in a fictional Australian prison in the desert.
- The Hard Word is a 2002 heist film partly set in an Australian prison.

== See also ==
- Crime in Australia
- Crime in New South Wales
- Crime in Queensland
- Crime in South Australia
- Crime in Tasmania
- Crime in the Australian Capital Territory
- Crime in the Northern Territory
- Crime in Victoria
- Crime in Western Australia
- Health of prisoners in Australia
- Justice Action
