= Crime in New South Wales =

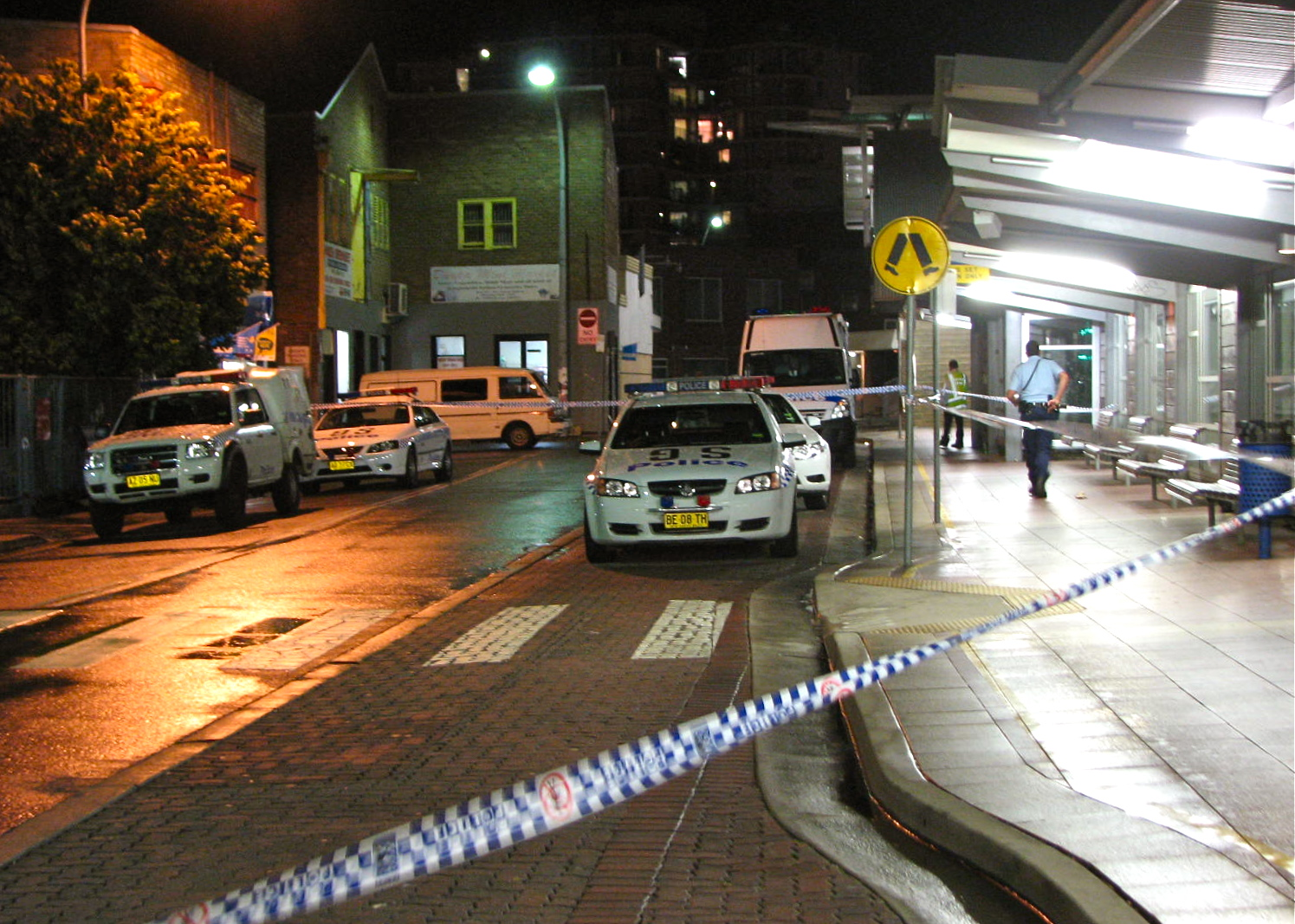
A crime scene from 2006

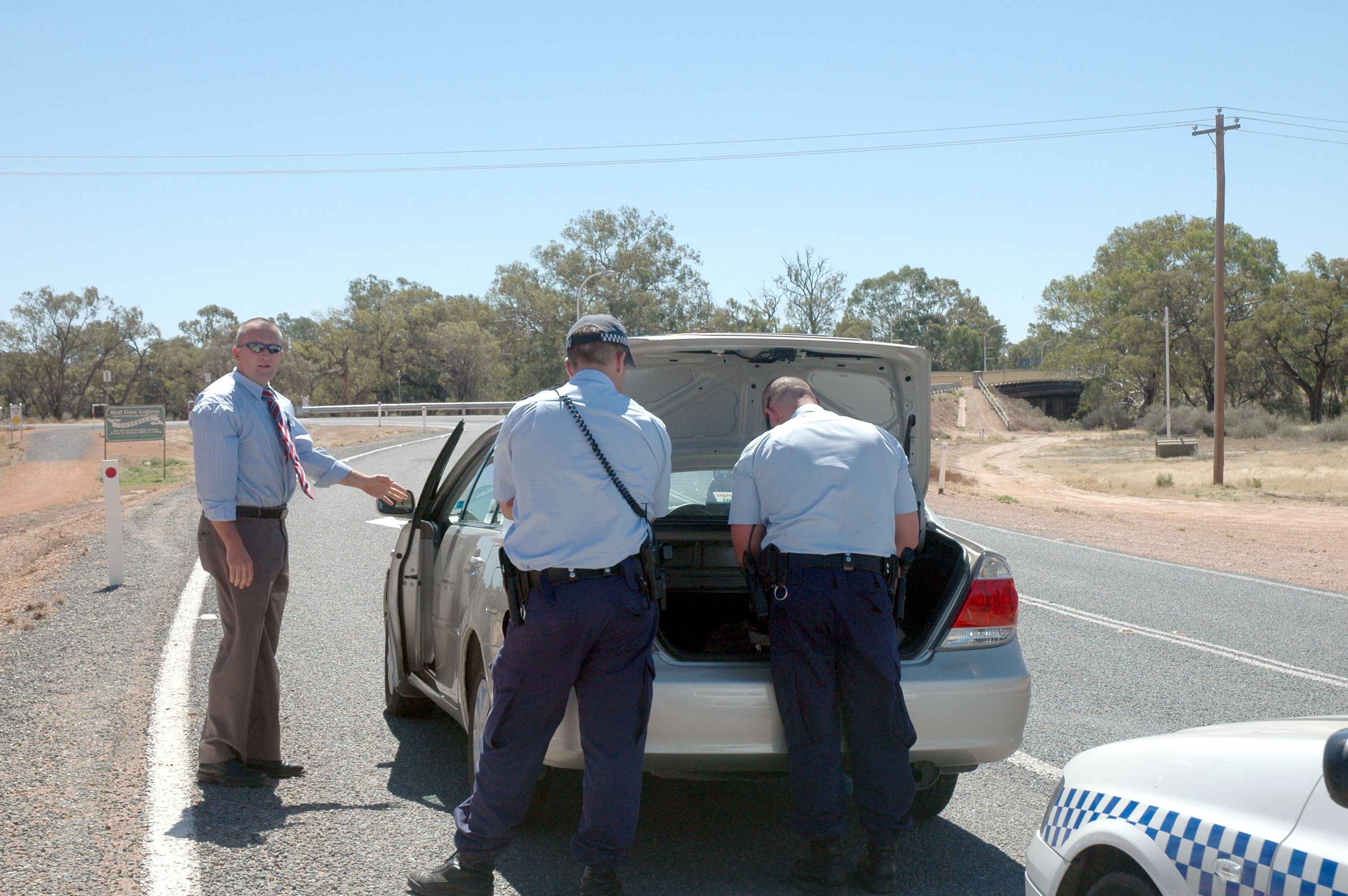
Police search for drugs, 2007

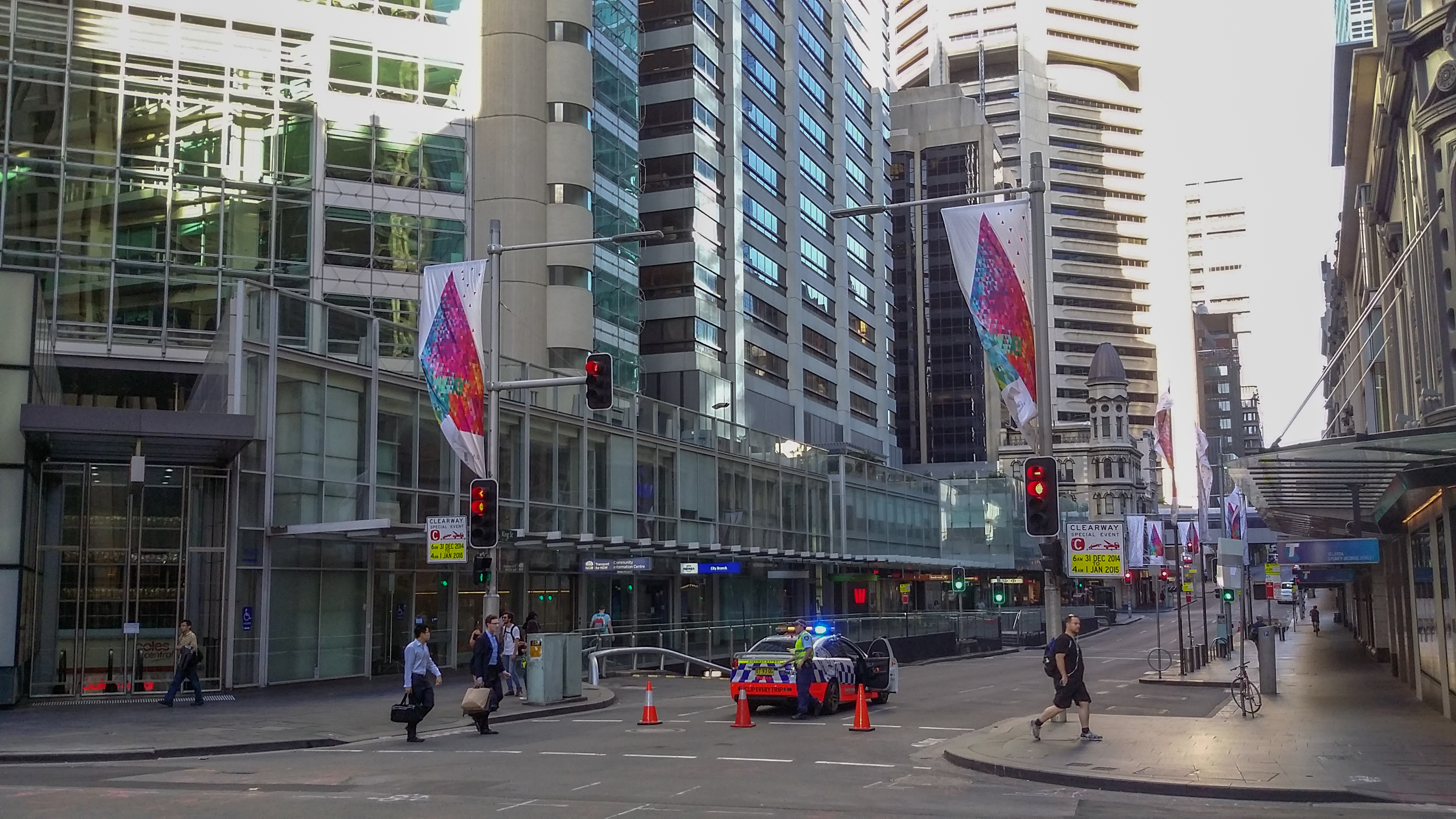
Road closures during the Lindt Cafe siege, 2014

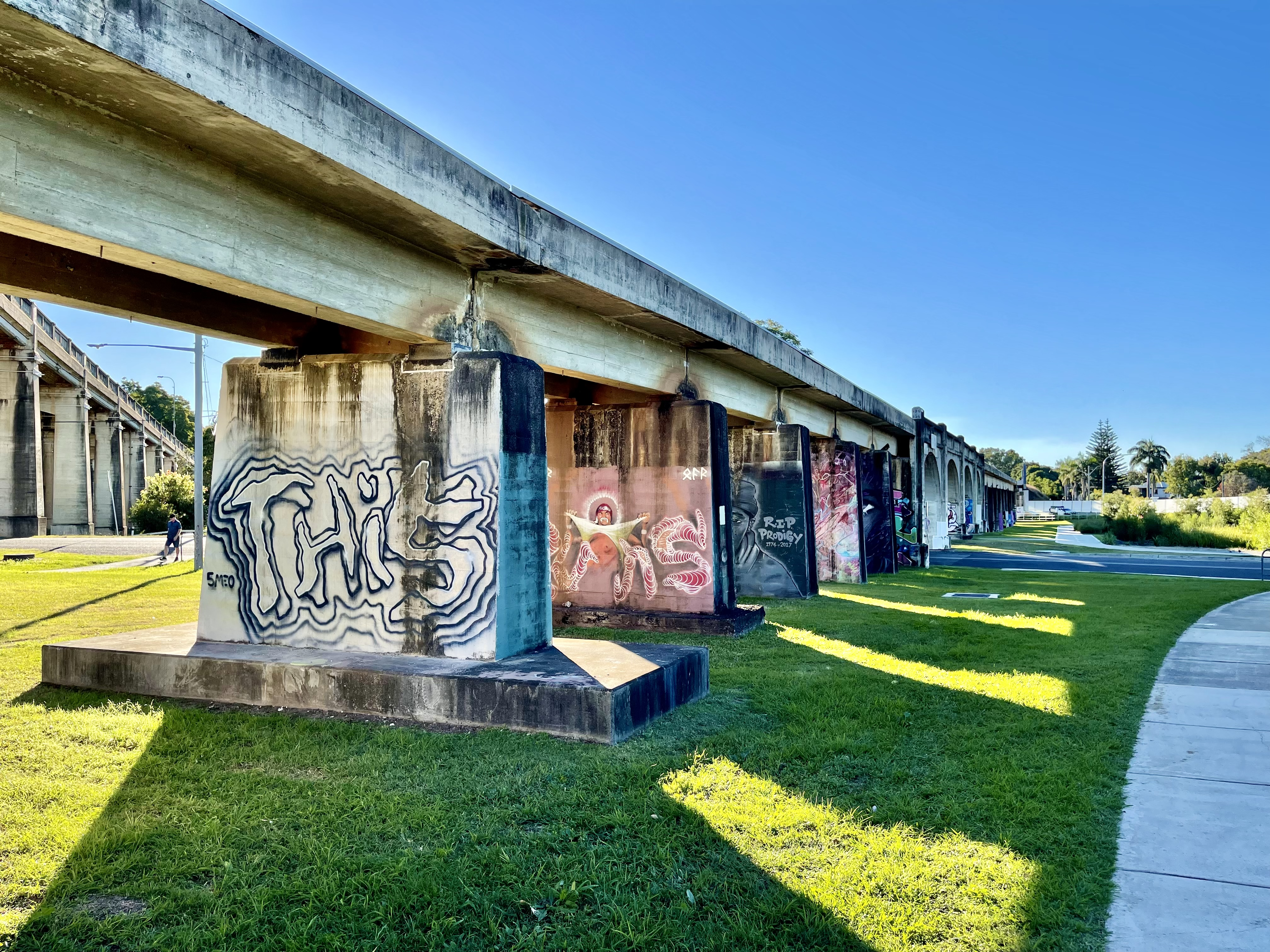
Graffiti under the Grafton Bridge, 2021

Criminal activity in New South Wales, Australia is combated by the New South Wales Police Force and the New South Wales court system, while statistics about crime are managed by the Bureau of Crime Statistics and Research. Modern Australian states and cities, including New South Wales, have some of the lowest crime rates recorded globally with Australia ranked the 13th safest nation and Sydney ranked the 5th safest city globally. As of September 2018 the City of Blacktown (495.1) and City of Penrith (475.7) had the highest rates of violent crime per 100,000 in Sydney. Rural areas have comparatively high crime rates per 100,000 with rural shires such as Walgett Shire (1350.3) and Moree Plains Shire (1236.2) having some of the highest violent crime rates in the state. The overall NSW crime rate has been in steady decline for many years.

New South Wales was founded as a British penal colony. The founding members of the colony included a significant number of criminals, known as convicts, there were 778 convicts (192 women and 586 men) on the First Fleet. The majority of convicts were transported for petty crimes. More serious crimes, such as rape and murder, became transportable offences in the 1830s, but since they were also punishable by death, comparatively few convicts were transported for such crimes. Common crimes in the colony were drunkenness, assault, and disorderly prostitution. Bushranging and absconding were also common, while the murder rate was low. The rate of conviction for less serious offenses gradually declined. Execution was used as punishment, though the rate of execution was low.

== NSW crime statistics ==
Crime in New South Wales (overall number of offences)
Type	2023
Homicide and related offences	79
Assault and related offences	76,533
Sexual offences	14,708
Robbery	2,204
Blackmail or extortion	1,874
Unlawful entry with intent	33,974
Motor vehicle theft	11,673
Other theft	117,870

=== New South Wales crime statistics ===
The Bureau of Crime Statistics and Research (BOCSAR) is the main source of NSW crime statistics. In 2017 BOCSAR reported an overall drop in recorded incidence with the murder rate (down 12.1%), robbery (down 8.0%), armed robbery (down 13.4%), burglary (down 5.5%), motor vehicle theft (Down 3.2%) and malicious damage to property (down 3.6%). There was an increase in the rate of Sexual assault (up 3.5%) and sexual offences (up 3.7%).

In 1997, BOSCAR found neither the proportion, type or design of public housing dwellings in a given postcode has a significant effect on crime rate.

== Massacres of Aboriginal Australians ==
Though often not recorded as crimes at the time, numerous crimes were perpetrated against Aboriginal Australians in New South Wales throughout the colonial period. Among the most heinous of these crimes were massacres. The following list tallies the better documented massacres of Aboriginal Australians in New South Wales. The information provided below is based on ongoing research 'Violence on the Australian Colonial Frontier, 1788–1960' undertaken by the Australian Research Council.

- 1816 Appin Massacre – In March 1816, a punitive expedition of a group of settlers was surprised and ambushed at Silverdale by a group of Aboriginal people armed with muskets and spears; four settlers were killed. Governor Lachlan Macquarie ordered an armed reprisal "to inflict exemplary and severe punishment on the mountain tribes...to strike them with terror...clearing the country of them entirely." Macquarie sent three detachments of the 46th Regiment into the region with Captain James Wallis being placed in command of the detachment of grenadiers.Governor Macquarie sent soldiers against the Gundungurra and Dharawal people on their lands along the Cataract River, a tributary of the Nepean River (south of Sydney). the soldiers used their horses to force men, women and children to fall from the cliffs of the gorge, to their deaths below. They counted 14 bodies "in different directions including that of an old man, women and children. The bodies of two warriors, Durelle and Cannabayagal were hauled up to the highest point of the range of hills on Lachlan Vale and strung up in trees.
- 1836 Mount Dispersion massacre In May 1836 Mitchell and his surveying party had been followed for several days by a group of Aboriginal people, starting from Lake Benanee, near the present-day town of Euston. Although it is not exactly clear what happened, it seems that instead of attempting negotiation, Mitchell and his men decided to launch a surprise attack on 27 May.[1] by a party led by Thomas Mitchell – A massacre of Aboriginal people along the Murray River at a place Mitchell afterwards called Mount Dispersion. Mitchell and his surveying party were followed by a group of around 150 Aboriginal Australians, until the surveyors laid an ambush, firing on the group as they fled across the river. At least seven people were killed, and likely more. A government inquiry was organised into the massacre after Mitchell published his account of the incident, but little came of it.
- 1838 Waterloo Creek massacre – Also known as the Australia Day massacre. A New South Wales Mounted Police detachment, despatched by acting Lieutenant Governor of New South Wales Colonel Kenneth Snodgrass, attacked an encampment of Kamilaroi people at a place called Waterloo Creek in remote bushland. Various witnesses accounts reported between 50 and 300 killed. Later in November the same year, Charles Eyles, William Allen and James Dunn (employees of Gwydir River squatter Robert Crawford) shot dead nine Gamilaraay people just east of present-day Moree.
- 1838 Myall Creek massacre at Myall Creek, involved the brutal killing of at least twenty-eight unarmed Kamilaroi people by eleven colonists on 10 June 1838. After two trials, seven of the eleven colonists were found guilty of murder and hanged.
- 1841 The Rufus River massacre – The massacre was led by the Protector of Aborigines, Matthew Moorhouse over a dispute between European overlanders and the Maruara people, the overlanders had been engaging in sexual relations with Maraura women without giving the Maraura the food and clothing that was promised in return. An estimated 30 to 40 Maruara were murdered, though Aboriginal oral tradition suggests this is a conservative figure.
- 1842 Richmond River massacres – A series of murders of groups of Bunjalung people around the Richmond River. The 1842 massacre of 100 Bundjalung people at Evans Head by Europeans, was variously said to have been in retaliation for the killing of "a few sheep", or the killing of "five European men". In 1853–54, at an area close to Ballina the Native Police Murdered between 30 and 40 Bundjalung people, including men, women and children while they slept. In the 1860s an estimated 150 Bunjalung were poisoned.

== Sydney ==
A volume was kept as an official surveillance record by William Augustus Miles who was Superintendent, then Commissioner, of Sydney Police in New South Wales from July 1840 to July 1848. Miles held the belief that much crime was caused by the contamination of innocent people, and that most of the crime in Sydney was the result of former convicts mixing with free immigrants. He believed that the criminal class required constant surveillance by the police.

=== Pushes ===
An early form of criminal gang in Sydney was the 'push'. In the 1870s, these were based on religious divisions, with The Rocks Push, the Gibbs Street Mob, and the Glebe Island Boys supported by Protestants. The Catholic gang was known as The Greens. Other pushes included the Straw hat Push, the Glebe Push, the Forty Thieves Push from Surry Hills, the Waterloo Push, and the Millers Point Push. Pushes in the early 20th century included The Surry Hills Mob (also known as the Ann Street Mob), the Loo Mob in Woolloomooloo, the Glebe Mob, the Newtown Mob, the Redfern Mob, and the Railway Gang, who controlled parts of central Sydney. The pushes generally died out by World War I, being used by politicians to attack rival meetings towards the end.

=== Razor gangs ===
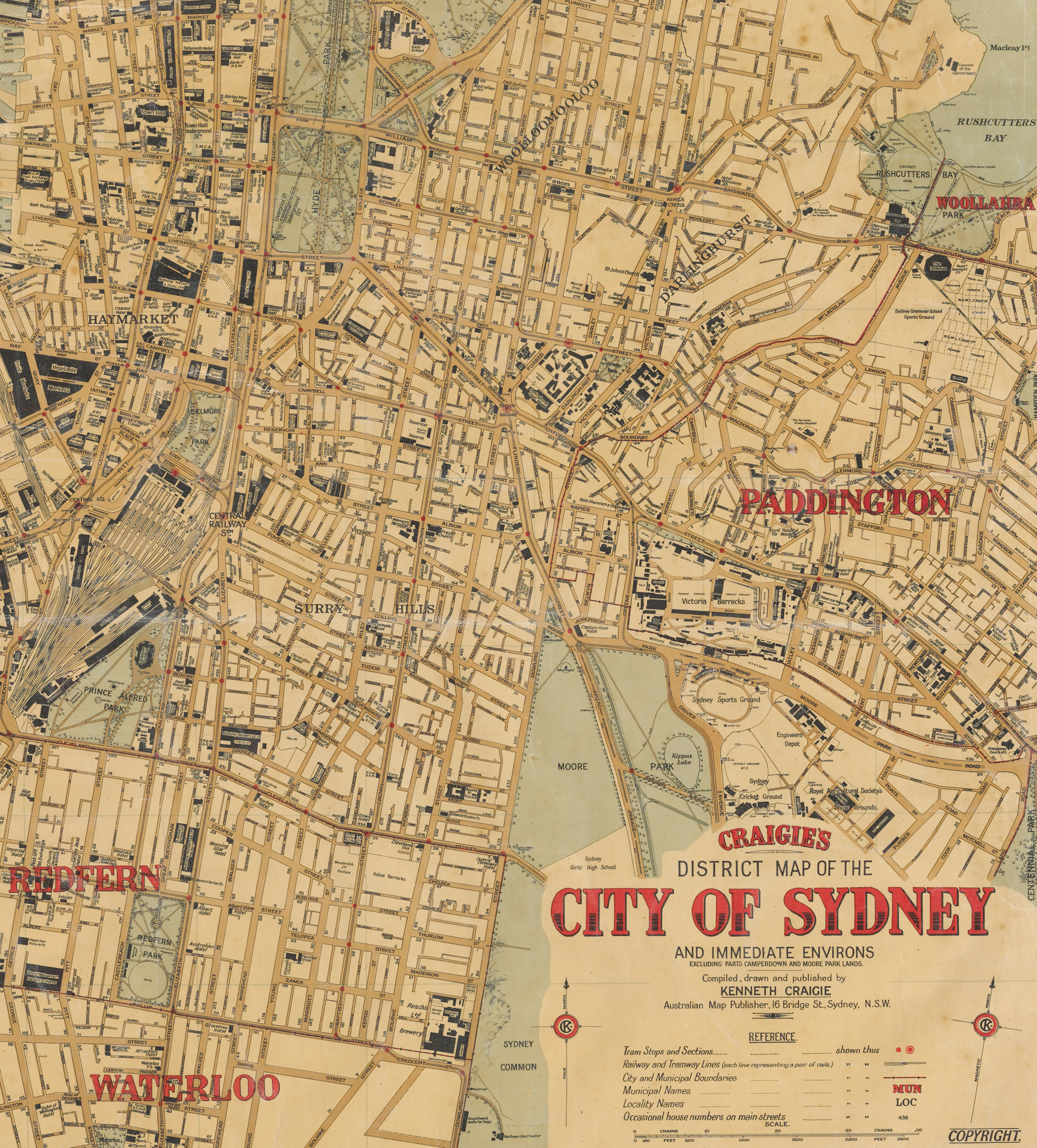
Razor Gang areas of Sydney, 1927

Razor gangs were notorious criminal gangs operating in and around Sydney throughout 1920s and 30s. The term "razor gang" refers to the preferred choice of a weapon during the period. Razors became a common weapon in armed robberies and assaults after the passage of the Pistol Licensing Act 1927, which imposed severe penalties for carrying concealed firearms and handguns. Sydney gangland began to carry razors instead of pistols

In the 1920s there was a significant increase in organised crime activity caused in part by the prohibition of sale of cocaine by chemists under the Dangerous Drugs (Amendment) Act 1927, the prohibition of street prostitution under the Vagrancy Act 1905, the prohibition of off-course betting under the Betting and Gaming Act 1906. Around the same time, the government introduced 6pm lockout laws, known as the Six o'clock swill, under the Licensing Act 1916. Other drugs sold illegally included morphine and opium, the latter imported from Hong Kong and the Dutch East Indies.

In the mid-1920s there were four major figures in Sydney organized crime, of whom two were women. These were Kate Leigh and Tilly Devine. Part of the reason was that the Public Offences Act 1908 had made it illegal for men to live off the earnings of prostitutes, but not for women. The two were on poor terms with each other. The third major figure was Phil 'The Jew' Jeffs, who was born in Riga. The final one was Norman Bruhn. The Crimes (Amendment) Act 1929 made the possession of a razor immediately preceding an arrest punishable by six months.

=== 1994 attack on Royalty ===
1994, Charles III then Prince of Wales, visited Australia. He was giving a speech in Darling Harbour during Australia Day celebrations. David Kang ran up to the Prince and fired two blanks before falling onto the ground; he was quickly arrested by the police. The Prince was not hurt and was ushered off the podium.

=== 1990s murders ===
In the 1990s, a number of high-profile murders took place. For example, Sydney man Ivan Milat murdered a number of people including foreigners, in the 1980s and 90s. He stored some of their belongings in his Sydney home. He was later arrested in 1993. In 1991, famous Cardiologist and researcher, Victor Chang was murdered by gangsters on the street not far from his home. They were arrested soon after. In 2001, Sef Gonzalez murdered his parents and sister for their money. At first police were looking for a suspect but the evidence led them to Sef.

=== 2014 Lockout Laws ===
After the widely publicised deaths of two 18 year olds, Thomas Kelly and Daniel Christie, the NSW government was pressured to take action in regard to alcohol-related violence in the Sydney central business district and Kings Cross in particular.

In 2014, then Premier Barry O'Farrell introduction of a series of "one punch" and "lock out" laws. The laws were included under constructive (felony) murder offences with the base offence of assault. The laws introduced a mandatory eight-year minimum sentence for alcohol or drug-related assaults that result in death, 1:30am lockouts at licensed venues and a mandatory 10pm closing time for bottle shops.

Sydney musicians, DJs and nightclub owners raised significant concerns following laws introduction, claiming that live music venues have low rates of violent incidence and would become financially nonviable. Other opposition to the lock out laws cite that the laws have not curbed violence nor do they show a decrease in alcohol consumption.

=== COVID lockdowns and restrictions ===
During the COVID lockdowns and restrictions in the 2020, 2021 and 2022, many rioters were arrested. And the police were accused of being handed.

=== Gang wars ===
There have been many gang related wars in Sydney. The Alameddine crime network has been engaged in a long feud with the Brothers for Life organisation, and also targeted popular YouTuber and comedian, Friendlyjordies.

== See also ==
- Crime in Queensland
- Crime in South Australia
- Crime in Tasmania
- Crime in the Australian Capital Territory
- Crime in the Northern Territory
- Crime in Victoria
- Crime in Western Australia
