= Crime in Victoria =

Victoria
- Crime rates* (2025)

Violent crimes
- Homicide: 3.1
- Rape: 70.5
- Robbery: 45.5
- Aggravated assault: 676.7

Property crimes
- Burglary: 571.2
- Larceny-theft: 2602.8
- Motor vehicle theft: 307.4
- Arson: 455.9
- Note: Reported crimes per 100,000 population Source: Crime Statistics Agency Victoria

Criminal activity in Victoria, Australia is addressed by Victoria Police, the Victorian court system, and community-based initiatives. The Crime Statistics Agency compiles and publishes quarterly updates on recorded offences, victim reports, and offender incidents.

In the year ending 31 March 2025, Victoria recorded a total of 474,937 criminal incidents, (Note: Distinct events reported to police, which may include multiple offences.) an increase of 20.1% from the previous year. The number of offences rose by 17.1% to 627,268, while alleged offender incidents increased by 19.4%. Reports involving person victims rose by 20.1%, and family violence incidents increased by 10.7%. Incidents involving Aboriginal and Torres Strait Islander people also rose significantly, with alleged offender incidents up 36.2% in the year to March 2025.

The Local Government Areas (LGAs) with the highest criminal incident rates were:

- Melbourne – 17,792.1 incidents per 100,000 residents (▲21.3%)
- Yarra – 12,767.2 (▲22.6%)
- Latrobe – 12,333.8 (▲10.7%)
- Mildura – 11,042.5 (▲4.8%)
- Ararat – 10,885.3 (▲25.2%)

The highest offence rates were recorded in:

- Melbourne – 22,955.5 offences per 100,000 residents
- Latrobe – 17,287.3
- Yarra – 15,467.9
- Greater Shepparton – 15,046.9
- Ararat – 14,844.4

While some regional LGAs have consistently high crime rates, Victoria overall has historically maintained a comparatively low crime rate in both national and international contexts. In particular, homicide rates remain lower than in many comparable jurisdictions. During the colonial period (1851 to 1901), the most common offence was drunkenness, and by 1907, it accounted for around 40 per cent of all convictions nationwide. Early crime records prior to Australian Federation are considered inconsistent, except for homicide data, which was more reliably recorded.

== Crime statistics ==
The rate of recorded offences in Victoria has fluctuated over the past decade, with notable increases in the most recent reporting periods. According to data from the Crime Statistics Agency, the overall offence rate rose to 8,838.7 per 100,000 people in the year ending March 2025, the highest level since 2017. The largest increases were seen in property and deception offences, which rose sharply from the previous year, as well as crimes against the person and justice procedures offences

Offence rates had generally declined between 2017 and 2022, with a notable dip in the immediate post-COVID-19 period. However, the trend has reversed since 2023.

Recorded Offences in Victoria (2016–2025) per 100,000 People – Year Ending March
Offence	2016	2017	2018	2019	2020	2021	2022	2023	2024	2025
Crimes against the person	1,201.1	1,261.7	1,248.0	1,236.0	1,252.8	1,282.9	1,241.4	1,244.7	1,234.8	1,369.1
Property and deception offences	5,052.2	5,141.4	4,476.1	4,403.4	4,729.8	3,864.8	3,587.1	3,833.1	4,288.7	5,221.8
Drug offences	498.3	490.3	445.7	495.0	512.7	609.6	450.2	459.2	438.6	460.8
Public order and security offences	605.4	567.1	540.1	541.1	478.2	477.9	424.2	438.7	396.6	413.3
Justice procedures offences	1,094.5	1,114.3	1,080.8	1,166.4	1,201.2	1,290.7	1,209.8	1,287.2	1,290.5	1,350.2
Other offences	25.3	26.1	26.0	27.4	19.3	591.4	175.8	19.1	25.1	23.4
Grand Total	8,449.9	8,600.7	7,816.6	7,869.3	8,194.0	8,117.5	7,088.6	7,282.0	7,674.4	8,838.7

== Massacres of Aboriginal Victorians ==
Though often not recorded as crimes at the time, numerous crimes were perpetrated against Aboriginal Victorians throughout the colonial period. Among the most heinous of these crimes were massacres. The following list tallies the better documented massacres of Aboriginal Victorians. The information provided below is based on ongoing research 'Violence on the Australian Colonial Frontier, 1788–1960' undertaken by the Australian Research Council.

- 1833–34 Convincing Ground massacre – Between 60 and 200 Gunditjmara men, women and children were reported to have been murdered. Committed on the shore near Portland, Victoria, it was one of the largest recorded massacres in Victoria.
- 1839 Campaspe Plains massacre – Between 40–50 Taungurung and Dja Dja Wurrung people were murdered by a group of settlers, led by Charles Hutton at Campaspe Creek, Central Victoria.
- 1839 Murdering Gully massacre – Around 35–40 Djargurd Wurrung people were murdered near Camperdown, Victoria. The massacre was committed by Frederick Taylor and others in retaliation for some sheep being killed.
- 1840–50 Gippsland massacres – Between 250 and 1,000 Kurnai people were murdered during a 13-year period, many of the murders were committed by groups led by Angus McMillan.
- 1840 Fighting Hills massacre – Between 20 and 80 Jardwadjali men, women, and children were murdered by Whyte brothers (William, George, Pringle and James Whyte). Near Hamilton, Victoria.
- 1840 Fighting Waterholes massacre – The Whyte brothers murdered a further 40 Konongwootong Gunditj people.
- 1843 Warrigal Creek massacre – Between 100–150 Gunai people were murdered by a group of around 20 colonists led by a Scottish colonist and pastoralist, Angus McMillan.

== Convicts ==
Convicts were never directly transported to Victoria, however at least 300 convicts arrived in Sorrento in 1803 as part of Colonel David Collin's short-lived, first attempt at British settlement in Victoria, in 1804. This first group of convicts also included the famous escaped convict William Buckley. Over the following decades small numbers of convicts were sent from Tasmania and New South Wales to carry out government work, surveying and labour.

== Eureka Stockade ==
From the 28th of November till the 3 December 1854 the Eureka Stockade took place in what is now the suburb of Eureka, Ballarat. Gold prospectors staged an uprising against the colonial government which lead to an armed conflict; 22 miners and 6 soldiers were killed. The event is significant in Australian history, particularly in regards to the development of democracy. In the colony's capital of Melbourne there was enormous support from the public for the captured Eureka rebels, this support was one of the factors that lead to the creation of the Electoral Act 1856, leading to colonists being granted male suffrage, on condition of owning property, in the lower house in the Victorian parliament.

== Royal Commission into Institutional Responses to Child Sexual Abuse ==
In January 2012 widespread sexual and other abuse of children by personnel in religious organisations was exposed by the Protecting Victoria's Vulnerable Children Inquiry. The inquiry recommended that a formal investigation should be conducted into the processes by which religious organisations respond to the criminal abuse of children within their organisation. In response to the inquires recommendations, the Chief Commissioner of Victoria Police, Ken Lay argued that the Roman Catholic Church's attempts to hinder investigations be criminalised.

Later in 2012, Prime Minister Julia Gillard, announced the creation of a Royal Commission into sex abuse within the Catholic Church. An estimated 60,000 Australians were abused in churches, schools, sporting clubs and health services, with the majority of the abuse occurring in New South Wales and Victoria. Institutions that failed to respond appropriately or effectively to widespread child sex abuse in Victoria include: the Anglican Church, the Catholic Church, The Salvation Army, the Jehovah’s Witnesses, Australian Christian Churches, Australian Pentecostal churches, Yeshivah Melbourne and the Christian Brothers among others. The Royal Commission into Institutional Responses to Child Sexual Abuse found that one school run by the Christian Brothers, St Alipius boys school in Ballarat East, was staffed almost entirely by paedophiles.

The Royal Commission found many of the worst incidents in Victoria occurred in the Roman Catholic Diocese of Ballarat. One of Australia's most infamous paedophiles, former priest Gerald Ridsdale was based in Ballarat and protected by church hierarchy, who shifted Ridsdale from parish to parish, between 1961 and 1988, in order to cover-up Ridsdales crimes. Ridsdale was convicted of 138 sex offences against children, he sexually abused as many as 50 children.

On 11 December 2018, Ballarat born former Cardinal George Pell, was convicted on five counts of child sexual abuse of two boys in the 1990s. Pell was eventually acquitted by the High Court of Australia.

== Melbourne ==
Despite Melbourne's CBD having the state's highest crime rate (15,949.9) the city is considered one of the safest in the world, with Melbourne being ranked the 5th safest city globally. The notably low crime rate is one of the factors that led to Melbourne being named the world's most liveable city by The Economist for seven years in a row up until 2017. The recorded homicide rate of Melbourne was 2.2 per 100,000 in 2018.

=== Notable major crimes and criminal figures ===
- Squizzy Taylor – Joseph Theodore Leslie "Squizzy" Taylor was an Australian gangster from Fitzroy, Melbourne. He was a prominent figure and appeared repeatedly in Melbourne news media. He was involved in the 1919 Melbourne gang war and was eventually shot dead in 1927.
- John Wren – John Wren was an Australian underworld figure from Collingwood, Victoria. Wren is best known for being the real life inspiration for the similarly named fictional character, John West in Frank Hardy's novel Power Without Glory.
- Mark "Chopper" Read – Mark Brandon "Chopper" Read was an Australian criminal, gang member and author. Read wrote a series of semi-autobiographical fictional crime novels and children's books and was the subject of the biographical film Chopper, starring Eric Bana.
- Russell Street bombing – The Russell Street bombing was a car bombing that took place in Melbourne's CBD in March 1986. The car bomb was detonated outside the Russell Street Police Headquarters complex in Russell Street, Melbourne. The blast killed a policewoman and injured 22 others.
- Hoddle Street massacre – The Hoddle Street massacre was a mass shooting that took place on a busy main road near the Clifton Hill train station, on Hoddle Street, Clifton Hill. The shootings resulted in the deaths of seven people, and serious injury to 19 others. Julian Knight, a 19-year-old former Australian Army officer cadet was arrested and charged for the shootings.
- Queen Street Massacre – The Queen Street massacre was a spree-killing committed by Frank Vitkovic. The spree-killing occurred on the 8th of December 1987 on Queen Street. Vitkovic killed 9 people including himself, and injured five others.
- The Pettingill family and the Walsh St killing – The Pettingill family was a notorious Melbourne-based criminal family headed by matriarch Kath Pettingill. Victor Peirce and Trevor Pettingill were accused and acquitted of the 1988 Walsh Street police shootings, with both acquitted along with two fellow defendants. Victor Peirce was later killed in the Melbourne gangland killings.
- Mr. Cruel – Mr Cruel was the moniker for an unidentified serial child rapist and suspected murderer who assaulted 3 girls and is the prime suspect in the murder of Karmein Chan. Mr Cruel was active between 1987 and 1991 and operated within the Eastern Suburbs of Melbourne.
- Melbourne gangland killings – The Melbourne gangland killings were a series of 36 gang related murders committed in Melbourne between January 1998 and August 2010. The murders were widely seen as retributive, involving various Melbourne underworld groups, and mostly took place in the northern suburbs. The majority of the murders are still unsolved. Now deceased underworld figure Carl Williams has been linked to a significant number of the killings. A number of notorious underworld figures were killed during the conflict including Lewis Caine, Mario Condello, Alphonse Gangitano, Charles Hegyalji, Graham Kinniburgh, Desmond Moran, Jason Moran, Lewis Moran, Nik Radev and Andrew Veniamin.
- Monash University shooting – The Monash University shooting was a 2002 shooting in which a 36-year-old international student killed students William Wu and Steven Chan, both 26, and injured five others including the lecturer. It took place at Monash University, in Melbourne, on 21 October 2002. The gunman, Huan Yun Xiang, was acquitted of crimes related to the shootings due to paired impairment, and is currently under psychiatric care. Several of the people present in the room of the shootings were officially commended for their bravery in tackling Xiang and ending the shooting.
- 2014 Endeavour Hills stabbings – The 2014 Endeavour Hills stabbings was a knife attack committed by Abdul Numan Haider. Haider attacked two counter-terrorism police officers with a knife outside the Victoria Police Endeavour Hills police station before being shot dead.
- Death of Patrick Cronin – Patrick Cronin, a 19-year-old boy, was killed in a Diamond Creek pub as he tried to pull his friend out of a brawl that was taking place and was coward punched. Cronin's killer Andrew William Lee received an eight year prison sentence with a five year non-parole period.
- Dimitrious Gargasoulas – Melbourne car attack – The January 2017 Melbourne car attack was a vehicular attack committed by Dimitrious Gargasoulas On 20 January 2017. Gargasoulas deliberately drove his vehicle into pedestrians in the CBD of Melbourne. Six people were killed and at least thirty others injured. Gargasoulas, was subsequently found guilty of six counts of murder.
- 2017 Brighton siege – The 2017 Brighton siege was an armed siege and shoot-out committed by Yacqub Khayre. Khayre murdered one person and held another hostage in an apartment complex in Brighton. The siege ended in a shoot-out with a police tactical unit, Khayre was killed and three police officers were wounded.
- Saeed Noori – Melbourne car attack – The December 2017 Melbourne car attack was a vehicular attack that took place on the corner of Flinders Street and Elizabeth Street in Melbourne's CBD. The attack resulted in the death of one person, and seventeen others were injured.
- Melbourne stabbing attack – The 2018 Melbourne stabbing attack was a vehicular and knife attack committed by a mentally impaired man, Hassan Khalif Shire Ali. Shire Ali set his car on fire and stabbed three people, one fatally, in the Central Business District of Melbourne, Australia, before being shot and killed by police.
- Apex – Apex, otherwise known as the Apex Gang, was a term used to describe an informal group of young male criminals accused of being involved in street crime in and around Melbourne in 2015–18. The name was frequently invoked during the "African Gang Crisis" debate in the media in 2018. The nature and existence of the "gang" was uncertain and many claims regarding the group have been described as exaggerated by police, politicians, journalists and others. Home Affairs Minister Peter Dutton claimed that Victorians were scared to go to restaurants at night because of "African gang" violence. Victoria Police stated that the group included a diverse range of young people from different ethnic backgrounds, the majority of them born in Australia.
- Kazem 'Kaz' Hamad - Melbourne tobacco wars – The Melbourne tobacco wars is an ongoing dispute between rival criminal gangs in Melbourne, Australia. The war has seen over 100 arson attacks on convenience stores and tobacconists in Greater Melbourne.

== Rural and regional crime ==
=== Mallee Mafia ===
The Mallee and Mildura in particular have long been associated with the Calabrian Mafia, with claims made by police in 1966 that annual organised crime meetings were held in Mildura to co-ordinate nationwide criminal activities. In a 1960s National Anti-Mafia Directorate report by John T. Cusack (United States' Bureau of Narcotics) and Dr Ugo Macera (assistant commissioner of police in Calabria) claims were made that the "ancient Calabrian Secret Criminal Society known as the L'Onorata Societa" and the "`Ndrangheta" were operating "throughout the State, with large segments in the fruit growing and farming areas of Mildura and Shepparton" adding that "There are reports the Society has existed in Victoria since 1930". They have reportedly been involved in revenge killings, cannabis production and weapons purchases.

During the 1980s the Mildura Mafia emerged as a major crime group that dominated marijuana production in Australia and ran an Australia-wide money-laundering network. Several notable mafia murders have been linked to the region including the suspected mafia hit on 43-year-old Marco Medici in 1983, police believe the murder may be connected to the assassination of anti-drug crusader Donald MacKay at Griffith in 1977. The 1984 murders of Melbourne gangsters Rocco Medici and Giuseppe Furina are also connected to Mildura through the Medici family. In 1982, 42-year-old Mildura greengrocer Dominic Marafiote and his parents were murdered after Marafiote gave South Australian police the names of Calabrian mafia bosses in South Australia, Victoria and New South Wales. In 2016 Mildura residents Nicola Ciconte, Vincenzo Medici and Michael Calleja were convicted and sentenced in Italy for their role in a plot to smuggle up to 500 kilograms of cocaine into Australia.

=== Rural methamphetamine use ===
Beginning in 2010, Victoria has seen a significant increase in the use of Methamphetamine, commonly referred to as ice. While relatively few Australians report using ice compared to other drugs, rates of methamphetamine use are significantly higher among rural and remote areas of Victoria compared to major cities. Rural methamphetamine use rates are 2.5 times higher than those in metropolitan areas. Prior to 2010 rates of use of illicit drugs in rural areas were significantly lower than those in the cities.

In 2014, A Comancheros Motorcycle Club member and former Australian Defence Force (ADF) sniper, Joshua Faulkhead, was arrested after being caught transporting large quantities of methamphetamine, cocaine and ecstasy between Sydney and Mildura. Faulkhead was sentenced to nine years and five months in jail.

In 2015, 20 people were arrested over an alleged large drug trafficking operation in Mildura in north-west Victoria. Methamphetamine, marijuana and ecstasy were seized in the raids. The drugs seized were reported to be worth more than $15,000. $20,000 in cash and weapons were also seized. Later that same year, Stephen Gillard and Geoffrey Hitchen from South Penrith, were arrested for possession of $300,000 worth of methamphetamines in scrubland off the Mallee Highway at Tutye, west of Ouyen. Local farmers uncovered plastic fruit juice bottles containing the drugs after noticing the men behaving strangely the previous day.

In 2017, a joint Australian Federal Police (AFP) and United States Drug Enforcement Administration (DEA) investigation lead to the seizure of $2.4 million in cash at the Mildura Airport, after 255 kilograms crystal methamphetamine were found at a storage facility in Northern California in June. the bust was part of an investigation into an alleged conspiracy to use a light plane to export drugs from the US to Australia. The 72-year-old pilot, a 52-year-old man from Zetland in Sydney's east, and a 58-year-old Melbourne man were charged with conspiracy to import a commercial quantity of border controlled drugs and money laundering offences. The crystal methamphetamine was reported to be worth $255 million. That arrests were connected to $2.4 million which was found in Mildura, in a prime mover that was driven from Adelaide in April.

== See also ==
- List of people legally executed in Victoria
- Crime in Australia
  - Crime in New South Wales
  - Crime in Queensland
  - Crime in South Australia
  - Crime in Tasmania
  - Crime in the Australian Capital Territory
  - Crime in the Northern Territory
  - Crime in Western Australia
