= Murder of Karmein Chan =

Murder of Australian girl

Karmein Chan
- Chan, c. 1991
- Born: 5 November 1977; Templestowe, Victoria, Australia
- Disappeared: 13 April 1991 (aged 13)
- Died: c. 14 April 1991; Victoria, Australia
- Cause of death: Homicide by gunshot
- Body discovered: 9 April 1992; Thomastown, Victoria, Australia
- Resting place: Templestowe Cemetery; 37.75947°S 145.14184°E (approximate)
- Occupation: Student
- Known for: Victim of unsolved murder

The murder of Karmein Chan is an Australian child murder case in which a 13-year-old Chinese-Australian girl was abducted at knifepoint from her home in Templestowe, Victoria, during the night of 13 April 1991. Karmein's body was discovered at Edgars Creek in the suburb of Thomastown on 9 April 1992; the prime suspect for her abduction and murder is an unidentified serial child rapist known by the moniker "Mr Cruel", who had abducted and sexually assaulted a minimum of three prepubescent and adolescent girls in circumstances markedly similar to Karmein in the years prior to her abduction.

Investigators believe Karmein may have been killed by Mr Cruel because she had either seen her abductor's face, or because he feared the child could identify him.

The manhunt to identify and locate Karmein's abductor and murderer remains one of the largest in Victoria's history. Despite intense publicity and repeated efforts to identify and locate her killer, her murder remains unsolved.

== Background ==
=== Childhood ===
Karmein Chan (Chinese: 陳嘉敏) was born on 5 November 1977 in Melbourne, to parents who had separately migrated from Hong Kong to Australia the year prior to her birth. Her parents, John and Phyllis Chan, had become engaged shortly after their arrival in Australia when both were in their early twenties. Both parents held strong work ethics, and by the time Karmein entered her teenage years, the Chan family owned and operated a lucrative Chinese restaurant and a Chinese takeaway, with both parents regularly working up to eighteen hours per day.

Karmein was the eldest of three daughters born to the couple, with sisters Karly (b. 1981) and Karen (b. 1983) completing the family. She spent her early years living in the suburb of Bulleen before the family relocated to Serpells Road in the suburb of Templestowe. All three sisters received a private education at the prestigious Presbyterian Ladies' College. Their parents ensured all three of their daughters were fluent in both Chinese and English, with Chinese being the language predominantly — though not exclusively — used within the household.

By 1991, Karmein was a year-eight student at Presbyterian Ladies' College, where she was known as a bright and diligent student with ambitions to become a barrister. At the time of her abduction she was recuperating from a bout of glandular fever, from which she had largely recovered by mid-April.

=== 13 April 1991 ===
On the morning of 13 April 1991, Chan attended her regular Saturday tennis lessons at the Camberwell Tennis Centre in Balwyn North, where she had begun lessons the previous year. Her mother later drove her daughter to the Bulleen Plaza shopping centre, where the two ate breakfast. That afternoon, friends of the family drove Karmein and her sisters to the Lower Plenty Chinese restaurant their parents operated, where the sisters ate an afternoon meal with their mother before an employee drove the sisters home at approximately 6:30 p.m. The sisters spent approximately one hour at home with their father before he left to attend to business needs at the Lower Plenty restaurant, just ten minutes' drive from their home.

According to Karly and Karen, their sister then read stories to them before all three sisters watched a "television special" about Marilyn Monroe in Karmein's bedroom.

== Kidnapping ==
At approximately 8:40 p.m., Karmein and Karly encountered a man dressed in a green tracksuit and wearing either a dark blue or dark green balaclava wielding a large knife in the family hallway; this individual asked the girls: "See this knife? Where's your mum and dad?" Both were forced into the bedroom at knifepoint, where the intruder discovered Karen hunched and whimpering behind the bedroom door. All three sisters were threatened with the knife before the intruder bound and gagged the two younger girls and forced them into a wardrobe as he held Karmein by her hair, saying to the younger sisters, "I won't hurt you." He then barricaded the wardrobe with a bed before fleeing with Karmein, who was barefoot and wearing only a white floral nightdress and underwear, at approximately 9:30 p.m.

Investigators later determined Karmein was led across the family garden and tennis court, through a security gate and onto Serpells Road, where she was almost certainly forced into an unknown vehicle parked close to the family home.

Shortly thereafter, the younger Chan sisters freed themselves from their bindings and the wardrobe before phoning their father to report their ordeal and Karmein's kidnapping. This call was made at approximately 9:45 p.m., with Karly blurting to her father Karmein was missing. Their father rushed home to discover Karly and Karen cowering in the laundry room; he briefly searched the house for his oldest daughter before reporting her kidnapping to police, who arrived at the home within minutes.

=== Investigation ===
The Victoria Police launched an intense search to locate Karmein. All available resources were devoted to the manhunt, with numerous officers assigned full-time to locate the child. The search involved 160 police officers conducting house-to-house inquiries across eastern Melbourne in the hope of obtaining eyewitnesses, the search of nearby properties and locations of interest, and the questioning of all known sex offenders within Victoria and New South Wales by detectives trained to investigate sexual crimes against minors. (Note: All the known sex offenders questioned in relation to Karmein's abduction were eliminated from the inquiry.) Search and rescue dogs were also used in ground level searches and although the sniffer dogs did detect the scent of Karmein's abductor at her home, the trail he had taken with the child ended at a vacant block just 300 metres from the family home on nearby Church Road, suggesting he had bundled Karmein into a vehicle very close to her home.

The graffiti left upon one of the Chan family's two vehicles, likely as a subterfuge to deflect her abductor's true intentions for abducting Karmein

An examination of the crime scene revealed that prior to entering the Chan household, the abductor had tampered with the electronically operated security gate to gain access to the property and either immediately before entering the Chan household to kidnap Karmein, or upon fleeing with the child, her abductor spray-painted "Asian drug dealer!", "Payback" and either "More and more to come" or "More anon. More to come" on the family's Toyota Camry in the front yard. (Note: An investigation into the Chans' background revealed no links to Chinese organised crime circles.) No ransom demand was left at the household, and although the family lived in a lavish A$1,000,000 home, no money or valuables had been stolen. Karmein's parents made several emotional televised pleas for their daughter's safe return—ultimately to no avail.

==== FBI profile ====
Within days of Karmein's abduction, Victoria Police contacted the FBI to request a psychological profile of her abductor. This profile was received on 24 April, and determined the individual most likely lived or worked close to the location of Karmein's abduction, worked either within a school or in a profession requiring frequent contact with educational academies, and that he would be diligent within his employment—having likely received awards of recognition for his achievements and/or performance. The individual would have created and retained pornographic material pertaining to his attacks which he would regard as of "great personal significance" to himself and, although regarded by neighbours and acquaintances as a polite and respectable, if somewhat introverted, individual, would have exhibited marked changes in his behaviour immediately following his abductions including "uncharacteristic" alcohol abuse and poor work attendance/performance in addition to a possible piqued religious interest.

Had this individual been in a relationship, the profile indicated his partner would have been aware of elements of his sexual dysfunction, including avid pornography usage and a requirement for his partner to dress as or imitate a schoolgirl in periods of intimacy.

=== Prime suspect ===
The location of Karmein's abduction, the victim profile, the description of the abductor's clothing, and the modus operandi surrounding her abduction led police to rapidly link the abduction to a serial sex offender linked to several kidnappings and sexual assaults of girls in the suburbs of Melbourne known in the media as Mr Cruel, who is known to have taken extreme measures to both conceal his identity in the commission of his crimes and to avoid leaving forensic evidence at his crime scenes. (Note: The extreme efforts this individual made to avoid leaving physical evidence at the scenes of his abductions and assaults has led several investigators and media personnel to suspect Mr Cruel had inside knowledge of police forensic procedures.) This link was released to the media twenty-four hours after the commission of the abduction, with investigators also rapidly determining the graffiti left by the abductor upon one of the family vehicles had likely been an attempt to distract police attention from this true motive for kidnapping Karmein.

We are optimistic;... If we are dealing with the same person who took [the previous children abducted by this individual], we know that he displays sympathy to his victims. We know that he is very clever; we think that he knows it is in everyone's best interest to release Karmein.

— Detective Inspector David Sprague, addressing the media to announce investigators' conviction of Mr Cruel's culpability for Karmein's abduction. 20 April 1991.

== Mr Cruel ==
Prior to Karmein's abduction, Victoria Police had actively investigated the abduction and sexual assault of several prepubescent and adolescent girls between 1987 and 1990 linked to Mr Cruel, (Note: Other sexual assaults upon prepubescent and adolescent girls and young women dating back as far as 1985 may also have been committed by the same perpetrator.) an offender who invariably struck on school holidays and who subjected his victims to repeated sexual assaults throughout their captivity but who had released each of his victims after their abuse. (Note: One investigative theory as to why this offender invariably struck upon school holidays was that he had access to unoccupied premises during school holidays.) This individual is believed to have been aged between 30 and 50 years old, between 5 ft 6 in and 5 ft 9 in (170 and 180 cm), of medium build, with fair or sandy hair and with a "small pot belly".

The degree of planning this perpetrator evidently devoted to the commission of his crimes suggested to investigators he had observed the movements and habits of his victim and her family for days or weeks prior to committing his abduction. This theory was corroborated by police reports received from several of the Chans' neighbours of a man in a parked sedan they had observed watching the bus stop close to the Chan household which Karmein used to travel to and from her private school on successive mornings in the weeks prior to her abduction. The investigation to identify and apprehend this individual by Victoria Police was given the name Operation Challenge, although the day before Karmein's abduction, police had begun scaling down their investigation.

As prior to the abduction, Mr Cruel had always released his victims after up to fifty hours of captivity, detectives initially remained optimistic that Karmein would be released.

=== Spectrum Task Force ===
On 6 May 1991, 23 days after Karmein's abduction, Victoria Police formed the Spectrum Task Force to investigate her abduction; this task force subsumed the previous crimes investigated by Operation Challenge. Forty investigators were assigned full-time to the task force, and a reward of A$100,000 was also offered for information leading to her safe recovery and the apprehension of the offender. More than 10,000 public tips were received, 30,000 homes searched and 27,000 people — including doctors, teachers, journalists and policemen — interviewed. All leads of inquiry failed to bear fruition and by June 1991 — the reward sum by this stage having increased to A$300,000 for the apprehension of Mr Cruel — Karmein's mother had begun practicing a Chinese custom of standing at her front gate every midnight and ringing bells as she called her daughter's name in the hope her eldest child would return home.

== Discovery ==
On 9 April 1992, Karmein's body was found in a section of wasteland close to the intersection of Mahoneys Road and High Street at Edgars Creek in the suburb of Thomastown by a man walking his dog, after he spotted a human skull buried in the landfill. A search by police uncovered several vertebrae and a jawbone. Chan was identified via DNA analysis and an autopsy revealed the child had died of three bullet wounds to the back of the head and that her body had lain at the site of her discovery for approximately twelve months.

Shortly after Karmein's identity was confirmed, her mother and sisters conducted a Buddhist ceremony at the site where her body was found.

=== Ongoing investigation ===
The Spectrum Task Force continued to investigate Karmein's abduction and murder for over two years following the discovery of her body. Public appeals for information yielded ample information, and the task force ultimately investigated over 10,000 public tips and searched over 30,000 properties. Seventy-three individuals were also arrested on suspicion of Karmein's murder, although all were ultimately cleared of involvement.

On 31 January 1994, the Spectrum Task Force was disbanded, although the investigation into Karmein's murder remained open.

== Aftermath ==
Karmein Chan was laid to rest on 16 May 1992 following a service at the Bulleen Baptist Church officiated by the Reverend Bill McFarlane. Her funeral was attended by over eight hundred mourners, including pupils and teachers from the Presbyterian Ladies' College and all members of the Spectrum Task Force assigned to capture her murderer.

A 1997 inquest into Karmein's death ruled that the child met her death through foul play but was unable to identify the person or persons responsible for her death. At the conclusion of the inquest, Karmein's mother publicly appealed for her daughter's murderer to give himself up, stating her primary concern is the safety of young girls "wherever [they] may be, and especially in their homes."

The offender was never brought to justice and is not known to have kidnapped or assaulted any further victims. A small number of detectives hold doubts as to whether Karmein was actually a victim of Mr Cruel—referencing the execution-style method of her murder as being indicative of a crime of retribution as opposed to a sexually motivated murder.

The case remains open, with cold case detectives regularly reviewing the investigation. On the 25th anniversary of Karmein's abduction and murder, a spokesman for the Victoria Police announced that the reward for information leading to the identity and conviction of her murderer had increased from the original sum of A$100,000 to A$1,000,000. A separate A$200,000 reward relating to the abductions and non-fatal assaults committed by Mr Cruel also remains in existence.

== See also ==
- Cold case
- Crime in Victoria
- List of kidnappings (1990–1999)
- List of solved missing person cases (1950–1969)
- List of unsolved murders (1980–1999)

== Cited works and further reading ==
- Andreson, Paul (2007). Dirty Dozen: Shocking Australian True Crime Stories. Richmond, Victoria: Hardie Grant Books. ISBN 978-1-740-66572-8.
- Collins, James J. (1999). Law Enforcement Policies and Practices Regarding Missing Children and Homeless Youth. United States: Office of Juvenile Justice and Delinquency Prevention. ISBN 978-0-788-18639-4.
- Cooper, Edith (2003). Missing and Exploited Children: Overview and Policy Concerns. New York: Novinka Books. ISBN 978-1-590-33815-5.
- Greenwood, Kerry (2000). On Murder: True Crime Writing in Australia. Collingwood, Victoria: Black Incorporated. ISBN 978-1-863-95138-8.
- Indermaur, David (1996). Violent Crime in Australia: Interpreting the Trends. Canberra: Australian Institute of Criminology. ISBN 978-0-642-24025-5.
- Pettem, Silvia (2013). Cold Case Research: Resources for Unidentified, Missing, and Cold Homicide Cases. Boca Raton: CRC Press. ISBN 978-1-466-57053-5.
- Reade, Helen (2003). Little Girls Lost: The Stories of Four of Australia's Most Horrific Child Murders, and Their Families' Fight for Justice. Braeside, Victoria: Five Mile Press. ISBN 978-1-865-03937-4.
- Sprague, Donald F. (2013). Investigating Missing Children Cases: A Guide for First Responders and Investigators. New York: Taylor & LFrancis Group. ISBN 978-1-439-86063-2.
- Tedisco, James N.; Paludi, Michele (1996). Missing Children: A Psychological Approach to Understanding the Causes and Consequences of Stranger and Non-Stranger Abduction. New York: State University of New York Press. ISBN 978-0-585-07649-2.
- Webb, Emily (2022). Suburban True Crime: Australian Cases You'll Never Forget and Some You've Never Heard Of. New South Wales: Big Sky Publishing Ltd. ISBN 978-1-922-61579-4.
