= Banksia Hill Juvenile Detention Centre =

Youth detention centre in Perth, Western Australia

- Interactive map of Banksia Hill Juvenile Detention Centre
- Location: Canning Vale, Western Australia; 32°06′35″S 115°55′09″E
- Status: Operational
- Security class: Medium to maximum security
- Capacity: 215
- Opened: September 1997
- Managed by: Department of Corrective Services
- Website: www.wa.gov.au/organisation/department-of-justice/corrective-services/banksia-hill-detention-centre-bhdc

Banksia Hill Juvenile Detention Centre is an Australian juvenile prison facility for offenders aged 10–17 years, located at Canning Vale, Western Australia. It was opened in September 1997 to replace Longmore Detention Centre in Bentley.

== Overview ==
The detainees have access to a variety of activities and educational programs. All detainees have individual "case management plans", which map out the education, training, employment, counselling or other activities they will do whilst in the centre, to work towards their return into the community.

Detainees must attend school until the end of the year they turn 17.

== Controversy ==
In January 2023, a class action was launched against the facility, involving 500 children and young adults who had been detained at the centre. In an affidavit, an allegation was made by an 18-year-old autistic female who claimed she had her human rights violated while detained: she alleges that she was subjected to shackling, seven months of solitary confinement and physical abuse.

In August 2024, a 17-year-old boy died by suicide at the facility.

== See also ==
- Rangeview Juvenile Remand Centre
