= Mr Cruel =

Unidentified serial child rapist and suspected murderer

- Tailored balaclava worn in Nicola Lynas attack – sketch by Victoria Police
- Years active: 1987–1990: three attacks; 1991: suspected abduction and murder (Karmein Chan)
- Known for: Being an unidentified serial rapist and suspected murderer
- Reward amount: A$200,000 for two abductions; A$1,000,000 for suspected abduction and murder
- Capture status: Not captured
- Wanted since: 1987

Details
- Country: Australia
- State: Victoria
- Location: Melbourne
- Weapons: Knife and firearm

Mr Cruel is the moniker for an unidentified Australian serial child rapist who attacked three girls in the northern and eastern suburbs of Melbourne in the late 1980s and early 1990s. He is also the prime suspect in the 1991 abduction and murder of a fourth girl, Karmein Chan. His moniker came from a headline in the Melbourne newspaper The Sun.

Mr Cruel has never been identified, and his three confirmed attacks and the suspected murder remain unsolved cold cases. There is a reward of A$200,000 for information that leads to the perpetrator's arrest and conviction for the two abductions. In April 2016, twenty-five years after the death of Chan, Victoria Police increased the reward for information that leads to the perpetrator's arrest and conviction, from A$100,000 to A$1,000,000.

Police describe Mr Cruel as highly intelligent. He meticulously planned each attack, conducted surveillance on the victims and their families, ensured he left no forensic traces, protected his identity by covering his face at all times and left red herrings to divert family and/or police attention. He was soft-spoken, and his behaviour was unhurried; during one attack he took a break in a victim's house to eat a meal. He threatened to injure his victims or their family members with a knife or a handgun.

== Crimes ==
On 22 August 1987 in Lower Plenty, a man wearing a balaclava broke into a family home at 4:00 am, armed with a knife and a handgun. He tied the hands and feet of both parents, and locked them in a wardrobe. He then tied the son to a bed, and raped the 11-year-old daughter. He had cut the phone lines.

On 27 December 1988 in Ringwood, he broke into a family home through the back door at about 5:20 am, wearing a balaclava and armed with a handgun. He bound and gagged the parents, and demanded money. He then grabbed their 10-year-old daughter, put tape over her eyes and a ball gag in her mouth, and abducted her. She was released eighteen hours later on the grounds of Bayswater High School.

On 3 July 1990 in Canterbury, he broke into a family home at 11:30 pm, armed with a knife and a gun, and wearing a balaclava. He tied and gagged 13-year-old Nicola Lynas, placed tape over her eyes, disabled the phones, and searched for money. He then drove her to another house and molested her for fifty hours before releasing her at a power sub-station in the suburb of Kew.

=== Suspected ===
On 13 April 1991 in Templestowe, a man wearing a balaclava broke into a family home at about 8:40 pm, armed with a knife. He abducted 13-year-old Karmein Chan, who went to the same school as the Canterbury victim. Chan's decomposed body, with three gunshot wounds to the head, was found a year later. Investigators believe Karmein may have been killed because she had either seen her abductor's face, or because he feared the child could identify him. It has been reported that some detectives had doubts about whether this crime was committed by Mr Cruel. Detective Chris O'Connor answered a journalist's question in 2013 about whether Mr Cruel was responsible, saying "we just don't know if it was Mr Cruel who murdered Karmein ... we just can't be sure because there isn't enough evidence to make a value judgement about whether it was or wasn't him in the Karmein case."

== Investigation ==
Mr Cruel is believed to have videotaped, or perhaps taken still photographs, of his attacks. Detectives believe that, if he is still alive, he will have kept the tapes and/or photos, and will still collect, and possibly swap, child pornography. They say he almost certainly continues to collect pornography through the internet, and may communicate with children using chat lines. Mr Cruel meticulously planned his crimes; for example, in one case, he abducted a girl and told her he would release her in exactly fifty hours, which he did. He bathed his victims carefully, with one victim describing the act as "like a mother washing a baby". In two cases, he took a second set of clothes from the girls' homes to dress them before they were freed. The modus operandi was the same in each of the three attacks, and victim statements provided confirmation to police that it was the same offender.

Spectrum Task Force reward poster for the abductions distributed in 1991.

Two of Mr Cruel's victims were able to provide police with details of the house where they had been kept. Both had been leashed to a bed. The same two victims told detectives that they had heard planes landing, leading police to believe the house was on one of the flight paths to Melbourne Airport.

Police established the Spectrum Task Force in May 1991, dedicated to catching Mr Cruel. The task force searched 30,000 homes and interviewed 27,000 suspects over the attacks, at a cost of A$3.8 million. There was a A$300,000 reward offered by the police for information that led to the conviction of Mr Cruel. A reward poster for the abductions was distributed in 1991 to all Victorian homes, and in certain areas in South Australia and New South Wales. Huge posters were placed in public places. The task force was disbanded in January 1994.

The task force investigated earlier sexual crimes from 1985 to 1987 with similar modus operandi, but could not locate some witness statements and crime scene exhibits, including tape and rope used to tie victims. The head of the Spectrum Task Force, David Sprague, said that some exhibits had not ever been examined by forensics, and had either been lost or thrown out. The police established a Rape Squad in April 1989, with nine detectives dedicated to investigating serial rapists throughout Victoria, particularly in Melbourne. The police established the unit after a review into the effectiveness of their rape investigations, by the Rape Investigation and Evaluation Group, found they needed a more coordinated and professional approach to investigations.

On 14 December 2010, police announced that the Apollo Task Force had been established about eight months earlier, following substantial new intelligence. The new task force had been reviewing both the Spectrum Task Force investigation and some new leads that had surfaced in the last year or so. The Apollo Task Force closed in June 2013 after finding the intelligence was not credible, ruling out the suspect.

Earlier in 2013, the Herald Sun reported that convicted serial child rapist Robert Keith Knight, who committed suicide in 2013, had been a person of interest. He had been convicted of two offences committed in 1980 and 1996. In Detective Chris O'Connor's opinion, Knight was not Mr Cruel.

On 9 April 2016, the Herald Sun newspaper published details of the Spectrum Task Force's dossiers on seven suspects, known as the Sierra Files, that were produced with the assistance of the US FBI. Detectives had been issued with an instruction in 1994 following the disbandment of the Spectrum Task Force that if another child was abducted, then all the Sierra Files suspects were to be arrested and questioned. The newspaper also published details of police witness statements from the victims and their families.

On 13 April 2016, on the 25th anniversary of Karmein's abduction and murder, Assistant Commissioner Stephen Fontana announced that the reward for information leading to the identity and conviction of her murderer had increased from the original sum of A$100,000 to A$1,000,000. A separate A$200,000 reward for information on the two abductions committed by Mr Cruel that leads to his arrest and conviction also remains in existence.

== Earlier crimes ==
There had been varying reports by the media of suspected attacks prior to 1987. The police have never released specific details of suspected attacks. Detective Stephen Fontana answered a journalist's question in 2001 on earlier attacks, saying "that there just wasn't enough known about him and [he] didn't want to speculate".

In a 2019 television documentary, retired Detective Chris O'Connor said that there was "broadly speaking perhaps up to a dozen" victims for the investigation. The first victim was a 14-year-old girl who was abducted from her home in Hampton in February 1985. During her assault, the attacker told her, "My liberty, my freedom, is more important than your life". An intimate swab was taken from the victim.

== Moniker ==
The Sun newspaper gave the perpetrator the moniker of "Mr Cruel" after police described a serial home invasion rapist in November 1987 as "super cool and super cruel". The name was adopted by the rest of the media. At the time, police believed the same perpetrator was responsible for three rapes: the first in 1985 of a woman, the second in 1987 of a girl and the third also in 1987 of another woman.

== See also ==
- Crime in Victoria
- List of kidnappings
- List of solved missing person cases: 1950–1999
- List of unsolved murders (1980–1999)
