= Rangeview Juvenile Remand Centre =

Former prison in Perth, Western Australia

State Youth Remand Centre – Rangeview
- Interactive map of State Youth Remand Centre – Rangeview
- Location: Murdoch, Western Australia; 32°04′33″S 115°50′42″E
- Status: Closed
- Security class: Remand Centre
- Capacity: 92
- Opened: 1994
- Closed: 2012
- Managed by: Department of Justice, Western Australia

State Youth Remand Centre – Rangeview was an Australian juvenile remand prison facility for between 10 and 18 years, located in Murdoch, Western Australia.

The prison was primarily used for the detention of juveniles held in custody awaiting trial. The detainees had access to a variety of activities and educational programs. Detainees aged 17 and under were required to attend school.

In 2012, the detainees were moved to Banksia Hill Juvenile Detention Centre and the facility closed. In November 2012, Wandoo Reintegration Facility opened on the site.
