= Wandoo Rehabilitation Prison =

Prison for women in Perth, Western Australia

- Wandoo Reintegration Facility is located just south of Fiona Stanley Hospital between Murdoch University and the Kwinana Freeway.
- Location: Murdoch, Western Australia; 32°04′33″S 115°50′42″E
- Status: Operational
- Security class: Minimum to Medium
- Capacity: 77
- Opened: 2012
- Managed by: Department of Justice

Wandoo Rehabilitation Prison, formerly Wandoo Reintegration Facility, is an Australian minimum and medium security prison for women located in Murdoch, Western Australia.

The prison commenced operation in August 2018 as a dedicated Alcohol and Other Drug (AOD) rehabilitation facility for women to help them break the cycle of addiction.

Wandoo has a campus-style layout with low-rise accommodation, communal kitchens, laundries and sports facilities set in gardens.

== History ==
The Wandoo Reintegration Facility was established in 2008.

Opening in November 2012 on the former site of the Rangeview Juvenile Remand Centre, the prison was privately managed by Serco Australia from that time until May 2018 as a minimum-security prison for 18- to 28-year-old men preparing to transition back into the community.

== Description ==
It is the first drug rehabilitation prison in Western Australia, and has been managed by the Department of Justice since May 2018.
