= Crime in Tasmania =

Overview of crime in the state of Tasmania

Crime in Tasmania has existed since the earliest days of the European settlement in 1803. Laws creating criminal offences are contained entirely in statutes, statutory regulations, and by-laws, common law offences having been abolished by the Criminal Code Act 1924 s 6. Most offences are enforced by Tasmania Police, although a small category of offences are prosecuted by other statutory authorities such as local governments, and the Tasmanian branch of RSPCA Australia. All offences are prosecuted through the Tasmanian justice system, and sentences of imprisonment are administered by the Tasmania Prison Service. Some crime statistics for Tasmania are provided on the Tasmania Police website.

== History ==
=== Early days of settlement ===
==== Conflict between indigenous people and settlers ====
From the days of early British settlement in Tasmania (then Van Diemen's Land) (1803 onwards) until 1832, there was a period of violent conflict between the colonists and Aboriginal Australians, spiralling into an era which became known as the Black War in the 1820s, partly driven by increasing competition for kangaroo and other game. Explorer and naval officer John Oxley in 1810 noted the "many atrocious cruelties" inflicted on Aboriginals by convict bushrangers in the north, which in turn led to black attacks on solitary white hunters.

There was a number of massacres of Aboriginal Australians during this time, notably the Cape Grim massacre of 1828, in which a group of Aboriginal Tasmanians gathering food at a beach in the north-west of Tasmania is said to have been ambushed and shot by four Van Diemen's Land Company (VDLC) workers.

==== Penal settlement ====
From the 1800s to 1853, Van Diemen's Land was the primary penal colony in Australia. Following the suspension of transportation to New South Wales, all transported convicts were sent there; in total, about 73,000 convicts, or about 40%, of all convicts sent to Australia.

Complaints from Victorians about recently released convicts from Van Diemen's Land re-offending in Victoria was one of the contributing reasons for the eventual abolition of transportation to Van Diemen's Land in 1853.

==== Statistics ====
There were few reliable crime statistics recorded before 1824, partly because population counts did not include indigenous people nor all military officials, although both of these could be counted as offenders and victims. The law was then a hybrid of British law and military law. Local magistrates dealt with minor infringements and most convicts' offences, with more serious crime being dealt with in the New South Wales Court of Criminal Jurisdiction. Magistrates also managed policing, sentencing and recording within their districts. Much of the recorded crime was committed by convicts, and some of the categories are no longer relevant, such as bushranging and convicts absconding; also, some activities then considered acceptable are now criminal offences, under the Criminal Code (Tasmania) 1924. In 1823 the Supreme Court of Van Diemen's Land was created under the New South Wales Act 1823 and began operating in 1824.

Police magistrates started getting paid in 1827. In the early years, the rate of conviction for crimes which demanded the death penalty (murder, bushranging, sheep and cattle stealing, housebreaking) was higher than corresponding rates in New South Wales. Rates of drunkenness and general misdemeanour among convicts were high but conviction rates for these gradually declined.

After transportation to Van Diemen's Land ended in the 1850s, the colony was renamed Tasmania and its legal institutions moved away from the military model and began to develop characteristics of a civil justice system. Crime rates declined towards the end of the century.

Crime and Punishment in the Colonies: A Statistical Profile (1986) collates crime statistics for Tasmania from 1875, and shows a steep decline towards the end of the century in both the Supreme and magistrates' courts. Crime rates peaked in the late 1870s (about 3,600 convictions per 100,000 people), reducing to about 1500 by the late 1890s.

=== 20th century ===
In the first half of the 20th century, crime levels stabilised, with crimes against the person in the Magistrates Court recorded as 40-55 convictions per 100,000 people. In the Supreme Court the trend dipped around both world wars, then gradually increased in the 1940s to 13 by 1950. Different types of crimes showed different trends.

After 1950, crime rates increased, peaking in the 1970s. New categories of offences relating to the use and effects of drugs other than alcohol, and also motor vehicles, contributed to this increase. In 2000, drug offences increased by 39 percent from the previous year. Other categories of crime fluctuated.

== 21st century ==
=== Statistics: 2017–2018 ===
According to the 2017–2018 national crime statistics, Tasmanians suffered slightly lower rates of crime against property (selected household crimes) and physical assault than the national average, but slightly higher rates of threatened assault.

Within the state, offences against the person increased by 6% to 4,574 in 2017–18, with this result above the previous three-year average and reflecting an upward trend since 2012–13. Assault accounted for most of these offences. Sexual assaults reduced, were mostly committed without a weapon and 82% of victims were female. Robberies reduced, but were still higher than the three-year average. Just one murder was recorded, the lowest number since 1988–89. Offences against property decreased by 7%, with 20,430 recorded in 2017–18, with the 2017–18 result below the previous three-year average. All other types of offences also reduced, with the exception of fraud (2% up), in line with the clear upward trend since 2011–12. Police clearance rates were up, to 51%, the highest rate in 45 years. There were 73 firearm incidents, higher than the previous three-year average.

==== Outlaw motorcycle gangs ====
There were six outlaw motorcycle gangs in Tasmania with 18 chapters and about 259 members.

==== Domestic violence ====
The number of family violence incidents continued to increase, with 3,385 incidents recorded.

==== Youth crime ====
In 2018, concerns were raised about the young age of many offenders, with gang members being children as young as 12 years old. Tasmania Police Assistant Commissioner Glenn Frame said that 12-year-olds were now committing crimes such as stealing cars, rather than 17- to 18-year-olds. 2017–18 crime statistics showed that children were responsible for 29.4% of all home burglaries, 41.8% of all car break-ins, 23.4% of all business burglaries, 24.4% of all car thefts, 12.9% of assaults and 15.3% of all serious crime. Police subsequently made juvenile one of their key priorities, which included involvement of other government agencies such as education, justice and children's services. Former Chief Magistrate Michael Hill has advocated more therapeutic approaches to juvenile justice, agreeing that there was a need to get into the minds of at-risk children early, before they came before the courts.

== Notable crimes and criminals ==
- Thomas Jeffrey was an English-born bushranger, serial killer, rapist and cannibal in the mid-1820s, before being hanged in 1826 at Campbell Street Gaol in Hobart.
- Martin Cash was a notorious Irish-born convict bushranger known for escaping twice from the prison at Port Arthur.
- John Whelan was an English-born bushranger and serial killer operating in the Huon Valley until his capture and hanging in 1855.
- The unsolved murder of 13-year-old Chrissie Venn near Ulverstone in 1921, was a sensation of the day.
- Frederick Thompson was convicted of the 1945 murder of 7 year old Evelyn Maughan, and was executed by hanging on 14 February 1946, the last person to be so punished in Tasmania.
- James Ryan O'Neill is a convicted murderer (convicted for a 1975 murder) and suspected serial killer, as of April 2022 serving a life sentence and Tasmania's longest-serving prisoner.
- Martin Bryant murdered 35 people and injured 23 others in the Port Arthur massacre in 1996.
- Susan Blyth Neill-Fraser was convicted of the 2009 murder of her husband, radiation physicist Bob Chappell, and sentenced on 27 October 2010 to serve 23 years’ imprisonment, without parole for 11 years and 6 months.

== Criminal justice system ==
The criminal justice system in Tasmania is administered by the Supreme Court of Tasmania and the Magistrates Court of Tasmania. The Supreme Court consists of a trial division, called the Criminal Court, and an appellate division conducting appeals from the Criminal Court, called the Court of Criminal Appeal. The Criminal Court sits at Hobart, Launceston and Burnie. The Court of Criminal Appeal sits only at Hobart. The Supreme Court also hears appellate proceedings, called Motions to Review, from the decisions of Magistrates. The Magistrates Court sits in its Criminal and General Division from four courthouses located in Burnie, Devonport, Launceston and Hobart, and additionally conducts occasional sittings from Huonville south of Hobart, Scottsdale in the north east of Tasmania, and from Whitemark on Flinders Island in the Bass Strait.

The state Department of Justice oversees the courts in Tasmania, as well as Births, Deaths & Marriages, Consumer Services, Worksafe, victim support, prison services, guardianship and other functions.

== Prisons ==
The Tasmania Prison Service is run by the state Department of Justice.

=== Prisons ===
- Hobart Reception Prison
- Launceston Reception Prison
- Mary Hutchinson Women's Prison
- Risdon Prison Complex
- Ron Barwick Minimum Security Prison

== See also ==
- List of prisons in Australia § Tasmania
- Punishment in Australia
- Tasmania Police
