= Crime in the Australian Capital Territory =

Crime in the Australian Capital Territory is controlled by ACT Policing (part of the Australian Federal Police), which is responsible for providing policing services to the Australian Capital Territory (ACT). Prisons are managed by ACT Corrective Services.

Crimes against person in the ACT for the 2017–2018 year were roughly equivalent to whole of Australia averages. Some types of crime, notably theft from motor vehicle, malicious property damage and other theft, were higher than the Australia-wide average.

== Pre-federation history of crime in the area ==
John Tennant was a bushranger active in the area in the 1820s. In 1826 Tennant and another man, John Ricks, absconded from their assigned landholder and took to the bush. Mount Tennent is named after him as it was on the slopes of this steep mountain, behind the village of Tharwa, where he would hide until his capture in 1828.

== Canberra ==
Canberra has the lowest rate of crime of any capital city in Australia as of February 2019.

The 2017 crime statistics showed a rise in some types of personal crime, notably burglaries, thefts and assaults. ACT Policing Chief Police Officer Justine Saunders blamed the rise in assault statistics partly on victims having more confidence to report crimes, especially family violence, but also growing recidivism and drug addiction. The pattern of crime varied widely amongst different suburbs, but armed robberies, home burglaries and car theft had risen sharply.

The Australian Federal Police Association said that police numbers across the ACT had not increased in line with the rapid population growth in the past five years, with president Angela Smith adding that the rise in violent, complex crimes showed that something was "seriously wrong".

Incarceration rates in 2017 were low compared with other states and territories.

== See also ==
- ACT Policing
