= Crime in Western Australia =

Crime in Western Australia is tackled by the Western Australia Police and the Western Australian legal system.

== History ==
=== Massacres of indigenous Australians ===
A number of massacres of Aboriginal Australians, some as part of the frontier wars, occurred from the 1830s until well into the 20th century. Few of the perpetrators were ever brought to justice.

=== Bushrangers ===
The colony had its share of bushrangers in the 19th century, the most well-known of whom was "Moondyne Joe".

=== Death Penalty ===
Capital punishment in Western Australia was formally removed from the statutes of the state with the passage of the Acts Amendment (Abolition of Capital Punishment) Act 1984. Premier Brian Burke later called this his "proudest achievement".

Western Australia was the second last state in which capital punishment was legal.

== Crime statistics ==
=== 2003–2004 ===
Western Australia recorded lower rates than most other states in Australia for violent offences, but had the highest rate of burglary. In 2003 the prison population increased by 3.4% with a similar increase in 2004.

=== 2007–2008 ===
84 homicides, 3,903 sexual assaults, 22,708 assaults and 1,849 robberies were recorded, with a total of 33,890 offences against the person.

39,482 incidents of burglary and 82,963 incidents of theft were recorded, with a total of 177,846 offences against property.

=== 2008–2009 ===
The chance of being a victim of physical assault was 3.8%. In comparison, the Northern Territory rated 5.7% and New South Wales, South Australia and the Australian Capital Territory each rated 2.8%. The rate of assault was 2,199 offenders per 100,000 people, compared with the Northern Territory's 4,832 and the Australian Capital Territory's 1,096.

The chance of being a victim of a break-in in Western Australia was 5.1%. This compared to the Northern Territory's 7.7% and Tasmania's rate of 2.6%.

68 homicides, 3,753 sexual assaults, 22,869 assaults and 1,862 robberies were recorded, with a total of 34,492 offences against the person. 36,364 incidents of burglary and 86,487 incidents of theft were recorded, in a total of 169,263 offences against property.

=== 2009–2010 ===
Australian Bureau of Statistics figures for 2009/10 showed that police action was taken against 2072.1 people per 100,000 head of population in WA.

The chance of being a victim of break-in was 5.2%.

76 homicides, 3,246 sexual assaults, 22,394 assaults and 1,70293 robberies were recorded in Western Australia, in a total of 32,922 offences against the person. 30,043 incidents of burglary, 73,215 incidents of theft were recorded in a total of 143,844 offences against property.

=== 2010–2011 ===
The chance of being a victim of physical assault was 3.6%. This compared to the Northern Territory rate of 5.8% and the lowest, Victoria's, rate of 2.0%.

The chance of being a victim of break-in was 3.7%, a significant drop from the previous two years. The highest-rating Northern Territory scored 6.8% and the lowest, Victoria, 2.2%.

103 homicides, 2,900 sexual assaults, 22,854 assaults and 1,793 robberies were recorded in a total of 32,479 offences against the person. 35,555 incidents of burglary and 77,897 incidents of theft were recorded in a total of 152,649 offences against property.

=== 2011–2012 ===
91 homicides, 2,645 sexual assaults, 22,818 assaults and 1,777 robberies were recorded in a total of 32,091 offences against the person. 36,551 incidents of burglary and 85,541 incidents of theft were recorded in a total of 160,445 offences against property.

=== 2013–2014 ===
Police statistics showed 86 homicides, 3,645 sexual assaults, 16,236 violent assaults, and 106 robberies.

=== 2014–2015 ===
Police recorded 88 homicides, 3,159 sexual assaults, 27,664 domestic and non-domestic assaults, and 1,359 robberies.

=== 2015 ===
Beginning with 2015, the government of Western Australia began publishing more detailed statistics.

In 2015, the government of Western Australia reported 290,895 total offences, broken down into several categories:

- Selected Offences Against the Person: 42,569
- Selected Offences Against Property: 175,195
- Detected Offences: 39,147
- Miscellaneous Offences: 33,984

=== 2016 ===
In 2016, the Western Australian crime rate was up roughly 1.4% from the prior year, with a reported 294,952 offences.

- Selected Offences Against the Person: 47,261
- Selected Offences Against Property: 170,269
- Detected Offences: 45,972
- Miscellaneous Offences: 31,030

=== 2017 ===
In 2017, the Western Australian crime rate was down roughly 5.8% from the prior year, with a reported 277,872 offences.

- Selected Offences Against the Person: 45,203
- Selected Offences Against Property: 156,913
- Detected Offences: 41,426
- Miscellaneous Offences: 34,330

=== 2018 ===
In 2018, the Western Australian crime rate was up by roughly 3.7% from the prior year, with a reported 288,053 offences.

- Selected Offences Against the Person: 44,734
- Selected Offences Against Property: 155,296
- Detected Offences: 42,407
- Miscellaneous Offences: 45,616

=== 2019 ===
In 2019, the Western Australian crime rate was down by roughly 0.08% from the prior year, with a reported 287,816 offences.

- Selected Offences Against the Person: 46,270
- Selected Offences Against Property: 157,932
- Detected Offences: 39,054
- Miscellaneous Offences: 44,560

=== 2020 ===
In 2020, the Western Australian crime rate was down by roughly 17.2% from the prior year, with a reported 238,168 offences.

- Selected Offences Against the Person: 51,985
- Selected Offences Against Property: 111,395
- Detected Offences: 36,596
- Miscellaneous Offences: 38,192

=== 2021 ===
In 2021, the Western Australian crime rate was up by roughly 5.2% from the prior year, with a reported 250,610 offences.

- Selected Offences Against the Person: 54,015
- Selected Offences Against Property: 123,266
- Detected Offences: 28,457
- Miscellaneous Offences: 44,872

=== 2022 ===
In 2022, the Western Australian crime rate was up by roughly 3.8% from the prior year, with a reported 260,103 offences.

- Selected Offences Against the Person: 58,108
- Selected Offences Against Property: 128,322
- Detected Offences: 26,910
- Miscellaneous Offences: 46,763

=== 2023 ===
In 2023, the Western Australian crime rate was up by roughly 10.7% from the prior year, with a reported 288,026 offences.

- Selected Offences Against the Person: 66,942
- Selected Offences Against Property: 138,555
- Detected Offences: 31,978
- Miscellaneous Offences: 50,551

=== 2024 ===
In 2024, the Western Australian crime rate was up by roughly 1.6% from the prior year, with a reported 292,605 offences.

- Selected Offences Against the Person: 75,984 Selected Offences Against Property: 133,439
- Detected Offences: 36,744
- Miscellaneous Offences: 46,438

== Indigenous imprisonment rates ==
A leading researcher in prison reform, Gerry Georgatos, said in 2014 that one in thirteen of all Aboriginal adult males in WA is in prison. He stated that this is the highest jailing rate in the world, with WA "...the highest jailer from a racialised lens of our Aboriginal people".

== See also ==
- List of people legally executed in Western Australia
- Civil disturbances in Western Australia
- Crime in Australia
- Indigenous Australians and crime
- Western Australia Police
