= Crime in South Australia =

Overview of crime in the state of South Australia

Crime in South Australia is prevented by the South Australia Police (SAPOL), various state and federal courts in the criminal justice system and the state Department for Correctional Services, which administers the prisons and remand centre.

Crime statistics for all categories of offence in the state are provided on the SAPOL website, in the form of rolling 12-month totals. Crime statistics from the 2017–18 national ABS Crime Victimisation Survey show that between the years 2008–09 and 2017–18, the rate of victimisation in South Australia declined for assault and most household crime types.

In 2013 Adelaide was ranked as the safest capital city in the country.

== Background ==
One of Australia’s most enigmatic unsolved crimes, the Tamam Shud case involves the discovery of an unidentified man on Somerton Beach, Adelaide. The case remains unresolved, inspiring books like Kerry Greenwood’s Tamam Shud: The Somerton Man Mystery (2012) and fictional adaptations.

Recent years have seen political contention over youth offending. South Australia’s opposition has labeled the situation a “crisis,” citing a rise in Youth Court cases from 4,700 (2019–20) to 5,800 (2022–23). Opposition spokesperson Jack Batty advocates for stricter bail laws and increased policing, while the government attributes the spike to COVID-19 disruptions and emphasizes rehabilitation.

South Australia maintains the age of criminal responsibility at 10, despite calls from advocates and the UN to raise it to 14. Police Commissioner Grant Stevens acknowledges challenges with repeat offenders but notes long-term declines in youth crime, rejecting claims of a systemic "crisis."

== Crime statistics ==
In 2013, Adelaide was ranked the safest in the country with the lowest rate of crime per population. As of June 2018, crime rates across the state had continued to decrease. In 2023–24, South Australia recorded 24,745 offenders proceeded against by police, marking a 4% decrease from the previous year. When adjusted for population changes, the offender rate declined to 1,487 offenders per 100,000 persons aged 10 and over, down from 1,575 in 2022–23. This downward trend contrasts with debates over specific categories, such as youth crime, which remain politically contentious.

== Notable crimes ==
- Beaumont children disappearance on Australia Day in 1966 - still unsolved.
- Disappearance of Joanne Ratcliffe and Kirste Gordon in 1973 - still unsolved
- NCA bombing on Waymouth Street (1994) - A SA Police member was killed and a lawyer injured.
- Truro murders - Murders committed by a young man just outside the town of Truro
- Barossa valley shooting - Police went to arrest a Barossa valley criminal Tony Grosser on various charges, but were shot at. One of the officers, Derrick McManus was "extremely fortunate to have survived" after being shot multiple (14) times and laying wounded for almost three hours until able to be rescued.
- Snowtown murders (1992-1999) - serial killings which occurred mainly in two outer-suburban suburbs of Adelaide, Salisbury and Elizabeth
- The Family Murders (1970s-mid-1980s) - Believed to involve a series of sexual assaults and murders done by a group of perpetrators, though only Bevan Spencer von Einem was charged, and he was found guilty of only one of the murders
- Murder of Derrance Stevenson (1979) - well known lawyer Stevenson, an associate of Bevan Spencer von Einem, was murdered and his body stuffed into a freezer in his distinctive Parkside home
- Rundle Street Siege (1976)
- Shooting of Dr Margaret Tobin (2002) - Dr Tobin was shot by former colleague, Dr Jean Eric Gassy while walking through Hindmarsh Square. She was transferred to the nearby RAH but died shortly after arriving.
- Rodney Clavell was a former prison guard with a long criminal history. He had committed more than a dozen offences including gun and traffic offences. He also held up a shop in the Adelaide CBD, shutting down a whole section of the CBD while talking to police negotiators.
- Murders of Karlie Pearce-Stevenson and Khandalyce Pearce: In the 2010s, the body of a little girl was found stuffed in a suitcase, next to a major highway. It took police months to identify the body and when they did, the girl was named Khandalyce. Her mother was also murdered but her body was found interstate.
- Jason Downie murdered three locals in Kapunda, in 2010. As he is not Australian citizen, he will be deported after his sentence.
- A ship carrying 400 kilograms of cocaine was intercepted in March 2022. It was the biggest seizure in South Australian history.
- The Somerton Man was found on the beach in the 1940s. His identity was not known and neither was the cause of death. In 2022, the authorities were able to discover his identity.
- In 2017 Roman Heinze, a resident of Salt creek kidnaps a German girl and Brazilian girl. They managed to escape and he is arrested. He is sentenced to 22 years in jail.

== Judicial system ==
In addition to the various federal courts, justice is administered by the Supreme Court of South Australia, the District Court, the Magistrates Court and the South Australian Civil and Administrative Tribunal.

== Prisons ==
The Department for Correctional Services (DCS) runs the prison service, in South Australia, except for the Adelaide Remand Centre, which is privately managed by Serco, and Mount Gambier Prison, which is run by G4S.

=== Prisons ===
- Adelaide Pre-Release Centre
- Adelaide Remand Centre – maximum-security prison facility for prisoners on remand
- Adelaide Women's Prison – both sentenced prisoners and those on remand; high, medium and low security female prisoners
- Cadell Training Centre – minimum security prison
- Mobilong Prison – low and medium security prison for men at Murray Bridge
- Mount Gambier Prison – the only privately run prison in SA
- Port Augusta Prison – high, medium and low security prisoners including protectees and special needs prisoners; includes some women
- Port Lincoln Prison – low security prisoners are involved in running an agricultural business
- Yatala Labour Prison – high-security men's prison.

== See also ==
- Punishment in Australia
- SAPOL (South Australia Police)
