= Department of Correctional Services =

Department of Correctional Services may refer to:

- Department of Correctional Services (South Africa)
- Department of Correctional Services, Jamaica
- New York State Department of Correctional Services

== See also ==
- Department for Correctional Services, South Australia
- Department of Corrections, U.S. departments
