= Arthur Stanley Brown =

Suspected murderer

- Born: 20 May 1912; Merinda, Queensland, Australia
- Died: 6 July 2002 (aged 90); Malanda, Queensland, Australia
- Occupation: Retired carpenter
- Spouse(s): Hester Porter (1944 – 1978); Charlotte Andersen (1978 – 2002)
- Children: Eight stepchildren
- Status: Deceased
- Motive: Pedophilia
- Convictions: Hung jury (2000); Deemed mentally unfit to stand trial a second time.
- Criminal charges: Murder two counts Sexual assault and rape 28 counts

Details
- Victims: 2–10+
- Country: Australia
- State: Various
- Date apprehended: December 1998

Arthur Stanley Brown (20 May 1912 – 6 July 2002) was an Australian man charged for the 26 August 1970 rape and murders of Judith and Susan Mackay in Townsville, Queensland. In his 2000 trial, the jury failed to reach a verdict, and a new trial was blocked on the grounds that Brown was too senile to be tried again. Brown's arrest attracted wide publicity, leading to a witness to the 1973 Adelaide Oval abductions identifying Brown as the suspect she had seen. Brown is thus considered a prime suspect for both these abductions and the Beaumont children disappearance in 1966 as well as for several other murders.

== Early life and criminal history ==
Arthur Stanley Brown was born in Merinda, Queensland, on 20 May 1912, and moved to Townsville with his parents when he was four. Following the separation of his parents, Brown moved to Melbourne with his mother. He remained there until he got his drivers licence, moved back to Townsville and obtained work as a meatpacker. Brown was exempted from military service in World War II as his job was listed as a reserved occupation. In 1946 he became a maintenance carpenter with the Queensland Department of Public Works, where he was known to his workmates as a polite, immaculately dressed man who ironed knife-edge creases in his work uniforms. Brown was nicknamed the "Scarlet Pimpernel" based on the verse from the play as he could be anywhere at any time due to flexible work hours and self-supervision.

=== Suspected murder of first wife ===
Brown married Hester Porter (née Andersen; 24 May 1910 – 15 May 1978) in 1944 following her divorce, and became a stepfather to her three children. On 15 May 1978 Hester, by now bedridden with arthritis, died from injuries Brown claimed she had suffered in a fall while trying to get on a commode, had hit her head and been killed, after which Hester's younger sister, Charlotte Andersen, who had five children, moved in with Brown. The couple married later that year. Some members of Hester's family believed Brown had killed her. One relative recalled that Brown was not grieving the day Hester died but was "shaking with fright" and appeared worried. Brown told family members that he had paid for a post-mortem that found the death to be an accident, but investigating police found this to be untrue and believed the family doctor had written out a death certificate without examining the body, which Brown had cremated.

=== Sexual assaults ===
According to Hester's older sister Milly, Hester had confided in her that she was afraid of Brown, reporting that she had caught him molesting a child and had tried to prevent him from being alone with other children. Milly once said that Hester had told her: "He doesn't just like big girls – he likes little girls too". Hester once gave a female relative the "prized" lacework she had inherited from her mother, saying that she did not want "[Brown's] next lady love to get it". When asked whom she meant, Hester identified her sister, Charlotte.

In 1982, another of Hester's sisters told her parents that Brown had molested her with a small girl. After this, many more of the Andersen extended family came forward to say they also had been molested and shown pictures of dead women in a secret room at his home. Following legal advice that taking the matter to court could be traumatic for the victims, the incidents were kept a family secret. However, as an entry in relative Christine Millier's diary, dated 23 January 1991, and produced at Brown's trial in 1999, reads: "Kids and I went for walk to Strand. Arthur Brown drove by and the kids called him "rock spider", shouting it out. Eventually they told me what a rock spider was". "Rock Spider" is a slang prison term for a child molester.

== Suspect for Mackay sisters murders ==
=== Murders and sightings ===
On the morning of 26 August 1970, Susan Deborah Mackay, 5, and Judith Elizabeth Mackay, 7, disappeared from a school bus stop 200 metres (660 ft) from their house in the Townsville suburb of Aitkenvale, less than 10 minutes after leaving home. A search for the missing girls was mounted after they failed to return home after school and continued until the girls' bodies were found on 28 August in the dry bed of Anthill Creek, 25 km (16 mi) south-west of Townsville. Susan was found first, and a trail of footprints from her body led searchers 70 metres (230 ft) to Judith's body.

It was speculated that Judith had fled while Susan was being murdered and had then been run down. A post-mortem revealed that Susan had been raped, strangled and stabbed three times in the chest, possibly after death. Judith had also been raped and stabbed three times in the chest but the cause of death was determined to be asphyxiation by sand. Their school uniforms, straw hats, and shoes were beside them, with each shoe containing a neatly folded sock while their uniforms were folded neatly inside their schoolbags.

The Townsville community was outraged by the murders. Police initially declined to post a reward, but after interviewing more than 6,000 men who lived in the area and having no progress in the investigation, posted a reward of $10,000 with an offer of a pardon for any accomplice who came forward.

One witness reported seeing the girls talking to a man in a car at the bus stop at 8:10 a.m. Just after 11 a.m., a car pulled into a service station at Ayr, 85 km (53 mi) south of Townsville, and the driver bought $3 (around 25-litre/ 5 gll) of petrol. The station attendant, Jean Thwaite, reported seeing two girls in the car, recalling the younger girl asking, "Are we there yet?" followed by the older girl asking the driver, "When are you taking us to mummy? You promised to take us to mummy." Not long after, Neil Lunney, a soldier recently returned from Vietnam, spoke to a driver who had cut him off.

Lunney stated that he saw two girls in Aitkenvale school uniforms in the vehicle and that the driver appeared to be trying to avoid being seen. The evidence given by Thwaite and Lunney were both rejected as unreliable as, in contrast to all the other witnesses who identified the car as "looking like a Holden", they had both identified the car as a Vauxhall and neither were questioned "in depth". Several witnesses reported the girls being driven around in a car. Two witnesses later reported seeing a man walking towards a car from the direction of the murder scene around 1 p.m. that day.

=== Identification of the vehicle and witness descriptions ===
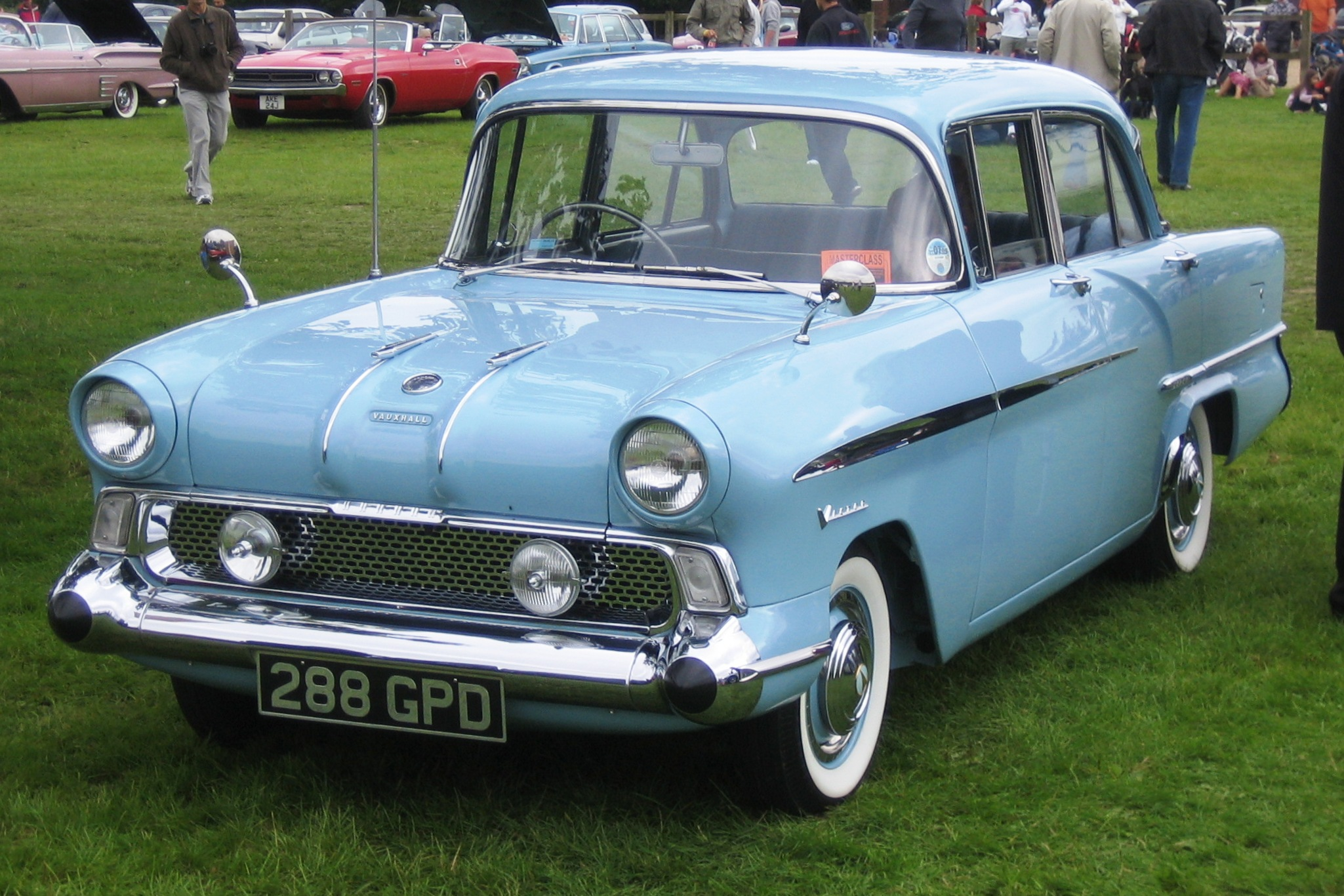
Two witnesses claimed the vehicle was a blue Vauxhall Victor, a very uncommon car at the time.

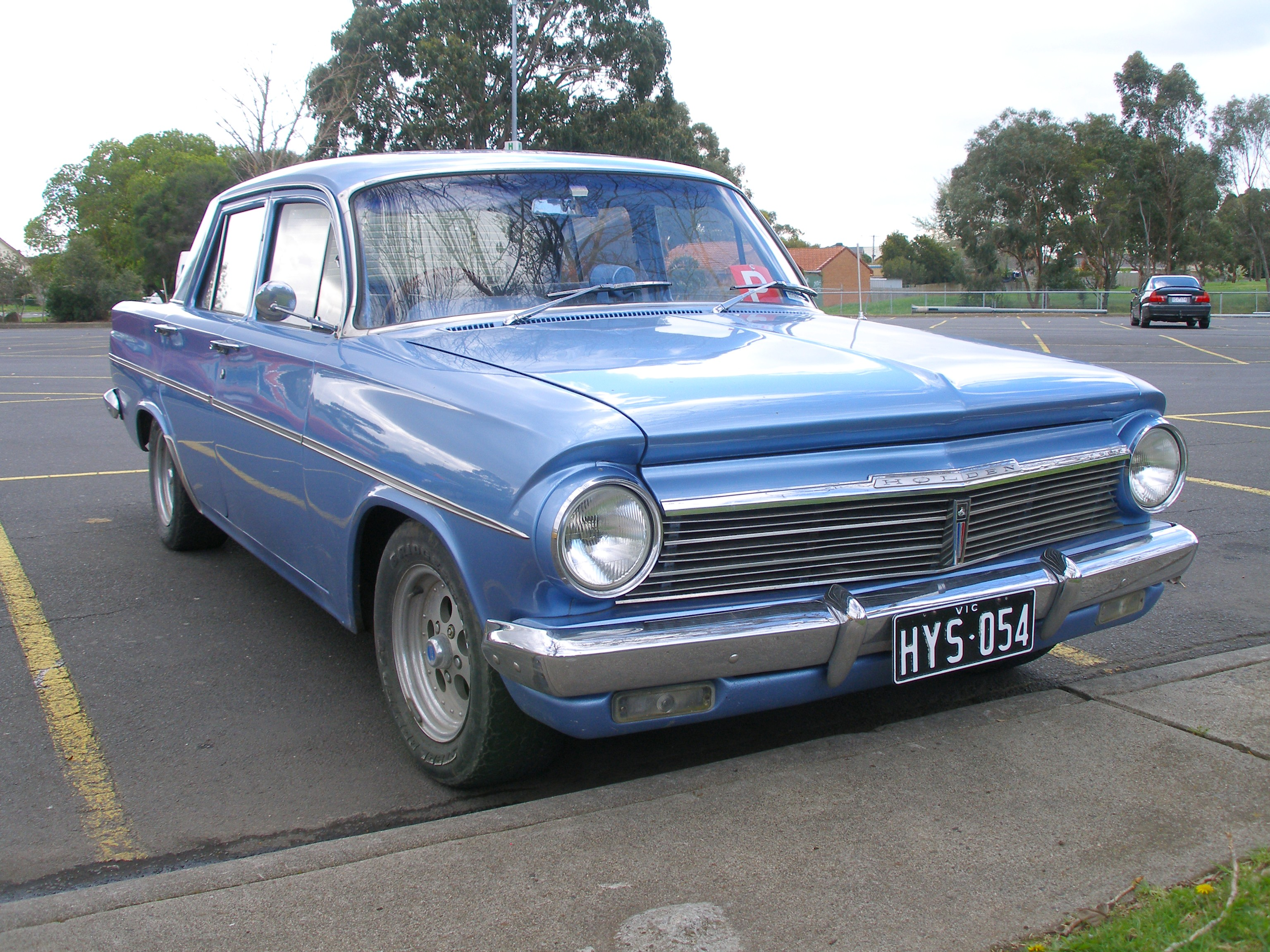
Several witnesses described the vehicle as blue in colour and "looking like" a Holden EH.

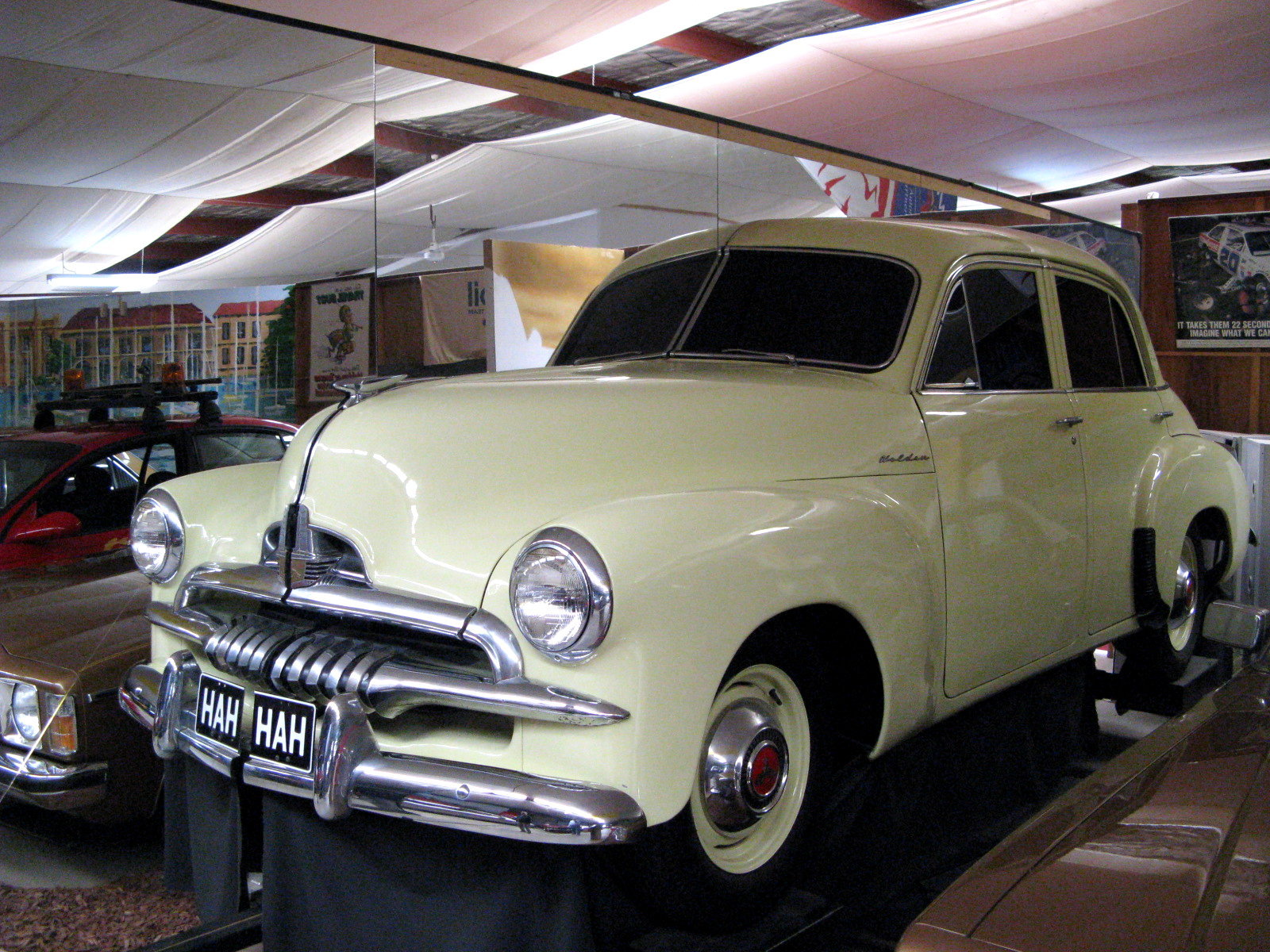
The media reported that the vehicle was a Holden FJ.

Several witnesses claimed the suspect's car looked like a Holden EH. Two witnesses, Thwaite and Lunney, said the car was a blue Vauxhall Victor, a very uncommon car at the time. A car seen parked near the murder scene was described as an earlier model Holden, possibly a Holden FJ. Despite the various descriptions of the vehicle, the two witnesses who saw the children inside the car gave matching descriptions of the driver, with him having high cheekbones, narrow skull, short dark hair and, as one put it, "Mickey Mouse ears", and both were in agreement that the vehicle had a driver's door that was a different colour from the rest of the vehicle.

Lunney would eventually be a key witness at Brown's trial, as he identified Brown as the driver with two young passengers that he had argued with over erratic driving that day. Although twenty-eight years had passed, Brown's appearance had barely changed and he was still very much recognisable as the same person when compared to photographs of him taken in the 1970s. This would be an important factor in identifying him as matching the sketch of the suspect in the Beaumont and Adelaide Oval abductions.

Inexplicably, Thwaite and Lunney later changed their minds and signed statements that the vehicle may have been a Holden FJ. The police, believing the car seen parked near the murder scene was the offender's, concentrated on finding the vehicle rather than the driver, thus no sketch or photofit picture of the suspect was ever released. Despite evidence from Thwaite that the suspect's car's petrol cap was on the left side which ruled out the vehicle being a Holden, the media only ran pictures of FJs.

Police were unable to locate the suspect's car at the time, and the murders remained unsolved. Brown, who matched the suspect's description and owned a blue Vauxhall Victor with an odd coloured drivers door, was never a suspect in the original police investigation. The evidence given by Thwaite and Lunney, who identified the car as a Vauxhall, was rejected as unreliable solely due to the belief held by police that the car was a Holden. The two witnesses were never questioned in depth, which police later admitted hindered investigations as they both were the only witnesses to speak to the suspect while the girls were in the car. The Mackay family moved to Toowoomba several months after the murders.

=== Suspect identification and arrest ===
In 1998, a cousin of Brown's wife, who was now living in Perth, and had been one of Brown's molestation victims, decided to phone Crimestoppers after they aired a program on the Mackay murders and expressed her suspicion of Brown in the murders. Sergeant David Hickey of the Queensland homicide squad, who was conducting the cold case review of the Mackay murders, returned the call three days later. The ensuing months of investigations by Hickey and Detective Brendan Rook, including interviewing other family members, resulted in forty-five cases against Brown relating to paedophilia and circumstantial evidence linking him to the Mackay murders.

Investigations continued and evidence accumulated. Brown, who had been working as a carpenter at the Mackay sisters' school at the time, had been obsessed by the case, falsely claiming he knew the girls' father and had offered to take two of his wife's cousins to view the crime scene two weeks after the murders. Brown had replaced the odd-coloured door from his Vauxhall Victor, buried it, then later dug it up and took it to the rubbish tip, explaining to his family he did it because he didn't want anyone interviewing or annoying him. Many of Brown's victims were taken to Antill Creek to be molested, and in one instance was only 20 metres (66 ft) from where the girls' bodies were found.

Brown had twice previously confessed to the murders. In September 1970, Brown was drinking with 19-year-old John White in the White Horse Tavern in Charters Towers. White, who did not know Brown, claimed that Brown had asked if he had been following the murder of the Mackay sisters a few days earlier and had then stated that police were looking for the wrong car and that he had committed the murders. White reported the conversation to the local police who had dismissed the claim after speaking to "Arty Brown". In 1975, Brown confessed to the murders to his apprentice John Hill who said he never came forward before because it seemed totally out of character and he thought Brown was joking. Brown was arrested on all charges of sexual assault and the rape of six children and for the murders of Susan and Judith Mackay.

== Potential links to other cases ==
After his arrest for the double-murder of Susan and Judith Mackay, Australian authorities investigated Brown for links to other additional crimes of a similar nature. As a result, Brown was identified as the prime suspect in a number of unsolved murders:

- Brown is considered to be a suspect for the Beaumont children disappearance as he bore a similarity to a identikit picture of the suspect. Jane Nartare Beaumont, 9, Arnna Kathleen Beaumont, 7, and Grant Ellis Beaumont, 4, left their home at 10 a.m. on 26 January 1966 in the Adelaide suburb of Somerton Park, where they caught a bus to nearby Glenelg beach. A woman reported seeing two girls and a boy come up from the sea after a swim and that a tall, blond-haired man had started talking to the children. They were never seen again. A search for a connection to the Beaumonts was unsuccessful as no employment records existed that could shed light on Brown's work history such as showing holidays when he may have travelled interstate. Some of the records were believed lost in the 1974 Brisbane flood and it is also possible that Brown, who had unrestricted access to government buildings, may have destroyed his own employment files.
- 14-year-old Marilyn Joy Wallman disappeared while on the way to school at Eimeo, Queensland, on 21 March 1972. Witnesses saw a blue Vauxhall in the area around the time of the disappearance. Brown and his wife Hester had visited relatives in Mackay, which was 13km from Eimeo, but his car, a blue Vauxhall, had broken down and the couple returned home by train. Brown returned to Mackay alone to pick up the car and police speculate that if the couple had taken an early train, Brown could have been passing Eimeo at the time that Wallman disappeared. In 1974, a fragment of skull was discovered 40 km away from where Wallman went missing and was positively identified as being Wallman's through DNA analysis in January 2015.
- Joanne Ratcliffe, 11, and Kirste Jane Gordon, 4, were two Australian girls who went missing while attending an Australian rules football match at the Adelaide Oval on 25 August 1973. The presumed murders are thought by South Australia Police and the media to be related to the disappearance of the Beaumont children in 1966. The case is sometimes referred to as the Adelaide Oval abductions. Although there is no proof that Brown had ever visited Adelaide, a witness recalled having a conversation with Brown in which he mentioned having seen the Adelaide Festival Centre nearing completion which placed him in Adelaide after June 1973. Another witness who earlier had reported seeing a man near the oval carrying a young girl while another older girl in obvious distress followed, identified Brown as the man she had seen after seeing his picture on television in December 1998 in relation to his arrest for the Mackay murders. She had reported that the man was wearing a pair of horn rimmed glasses which had fallen to the ground, been picked up and placed in a pocket. Brown is known to have worn horn rimmed reading glasses which police consider a significant point in the identification.
- 18-year-old Catherine Pamela Graham was murdered in Oak Valley, 18 km south of Townsville, on 28 July 1975. Graham had been selling books door-to-door on the day she was murdered and had been seen door-knocking close to Brown's house. Graham had phoned her mother from a phone box that evening and her last words to her mother were: "There is someone peering at me mum – and I don't like the look of him." Having left the phone box, she bought a hamburger at the nearby Rising Sun fish shop at 8:10 p.m. and then visited a friend at Townsville General Hospital. She next proceeded to the Townsville Post Office, where she was last seen leaving at 9:00 p.m. The following day, her brutally battered body was discovered in tall grass off the Flinders Highway, Queensland, 24 km west of Townsville. Her body was discovered only 500 metres from where the bodies of the Mackay sisters had been found in 1970. Police have evidence that two men were involved in the murder but admit that the disposal of Graham's body was very similar to that of the Mackay sisters and that there are other similarities which have not been released to the public.

== Trial and death ==
The trial of Brown for the murders of the Mackay sisters began on 18 October 1999. Although evidence regarding Brown's paedophilia had been given at the committal hearing it had been ruled prejudicial at trial and therefore could not be put before the Supreme Court jury. The jury were unable to reach a decision on the strong but circumstantial evidence. Trial was set for 25 July 2000, when the defence argued Brown was unfit to plead and a new trial was set for 31 July, but before it could start newspapers reported that "the case did not proceed for legal reasons which cannot be published". The court suppressed release of the legal reasons until July 2001.

In 2001, it was revealed that Brown's lawyer had applied for a section 613 verdict from the jury which meant that Brown would have been considered unfit to be tried. The jury had rejected the application, but in the meantime Brown's wife, Charlotte, had referred the case to the Queensland Mental Health Tribunal who ruled that Brown had progressive dementia and was also suffering from Alzheimer's disease, and was thus unfit to stand trial. The Attorney-General lodged an appeal and the court concluded that the tribunal did not have the jurisdiction to overrule the jury and commissioned an independent psychiatric report. In July 2001, the report concluded that Brown was unfit to stand trial because he was suffering from dementia and Alzheimer's disease. Although the psychiatric report could not overrule the courts finding that the trial could proceed, Queensland's Director of Public Prosecutions, Leanne Clare, announced on 3 July that her office had decided not to proceed with the retrial and all charges against Brown were dropped.

His wife, Charlotte, died in April 2002. Ostracised by his family, Brown moved into a nursing home in Malanda, where he died three months later on 6 July, officially an innocent man. Brown left instructions that no funeral notices be placed and only one stepdaughter had knowledge of the funeral details. His death was not reported until several weeks after the funeral.
