= Con Polites =

Australian businessman

- Born: Constantine George Polites; 29 March 1919; Port Pirie, South Australia, Australia
- Died: 22 September 2001 (aged 82); Adelaide, South Australia, Australia
- Occupations: Businessman and entrepreneur
- Known for: Commercial Property

Constantine George "Con" Polites was (29 March 1919 – 22 September 2001) was an Australian businessman, known in particular as a commercial property tycoon in South Australia.

== Early life ==
Polites was born in Port Pirie to Greek immigrant parents. He left school at 15 and became a shoe repairer, later running a delicatessen, working in a Woolworths supermarket, and managing a munitions factory during World War II. As a young man he moved to Sydney where he worked in the taxi, car hire, and catering industries before returning to Adelaide in 1959.

== Property empire ==
Upon his return to Adelaide in 1959, Polites commenced purchasing cheap city buildings, renovating them and leasing them out to migrants. Establishing the Princes Group, Polites became one of the most visible property owners in South Australia by erecting blue and white "Polites" on most of the properties owned. In 1989, the Australian Financial Review estimated his minimum net worth to be $70 million.

== Profile ==
Polites became a colourful personality within Adelaide, becoming known for his extravagant Cadillac and Rolls Royce cars, and usually seen smoking a cigar. Polites was once known as the "king of Hindley Street".

In 1966, Polites funded the expenses of Dutch psychic Gerard Croiset to travel to Adelaide and unsuccessfully assist in the search for the missing Beaumont Children. Later in 1996, he organised a search of a Somerton Park warehouse, including drilling holes, in an effort to determine if the children were buried there.

== Properties ==
The following properties were known to be part of the Polites portfolio:

=== Adelaide ===
- 235 Grenfell Street (The Producers Hotel, formerly Old Exchange Hotel)
- 38 Currie Street
- 66 Gawler Place
- 38 Hindley Street
- 48 Hindley Street
- 58-60 Hindley Street (Black Bull, formerly Princes Berkeley Hotel)
- 61 Hindley Street
- 84–86 Hindley Street (Kandy Shop Nightclub)
- 90–100 Hindley Street (Woolshed on Hindley, formerly Victoria Hotel and Jules Bar)
- 102 Hindley Street
- 103 Hindley Street
- 254 Hindley Street
- 262 Hindley Street (Princes Arcade)
- 220 Hutt Street (Clarice Motel)
- 46 King William Street
- 107 King William Street (Ambassadors Hotel)
- 118–120 King William Street (Polites House)
- 1 Rundle Mall
- 10 Rundle Mall
- 291 Rundle Street
- 25 Victoria Street
- 24–28 Waymouth Street

=== Glenelg ===
- 24–28 Jetty Road (The Colley Hotel, formerly Jetty Bar)
- 47 Jetty Road

=== North Adelaide ===
- 71–75 Lefevre Terrace (Princes Lodge Motel)
- 33 O'Connell Street

=== Somerton Park ===
- 23 Esplanade

== Personal life ==
Con Polites married Florence Gemenis and had three children, Elen, Evon and George.

== Events after death ==
- In 2016, Polite's grave was excavated as part of an investigation into a mysterious package left at the gravesite of a dead cat wrapped inside a towel inside a pet carrier. A package containing an animal liver, candle, and note with a red ribbon on top was also reportedly found at his son George's home.
- In 2024, a legal dispute over the Polites estate was publicised.
