= George Duncan (lecturer) =

Australian law lecturer (1930–1972)

- Dr George Duncan
- Born: George Ian Ogilvie Duncan; 20 July 1930; Golders Green, London, England
- Died: 10 May 1972 (aged 41); Adelaide, South Australia, Australia
- Known for: Law lecturer Homosexual law reform

George Ian Ogilvie Duncan (20 July 1930 – 10 May 1972) was an Australian law lecturer at the University of Adelaide who drowned in 1972 after being thrown into the River Torrens by a group of men believed to be police officers. Public outrage generated by the murder became the trigger for homosexual law reform, which led to South Australia becoming the first Australian state to decriminalise homosexuality.

== Early life and career ==
George Duncan was born on 20 July 1930 at Golders Green, London, England, the only child of New Zealand–born parents Ronald Ogilvie Duncan (d.1952) and his second wife, Hazel Kerr née Martell (d.1944). Emigrating to Victoria in 1937, Duncan attended Melbourne Grammar School, graduating dux in 1947.

While taking an honours degree in classical philology at the University of Melbourne, Duncan's studies were interrupted in 1950 after contracting tuberculosis. In 1957, Duncan entered St John's College, Cambridge, where he was awarded a number of degrees, including a B.A. in 1960; a Bachelor of Laws in 1961; an M.A. in 1963 and a Ph.D. in 1964. From 1966 to 1971, he taught law part-time at the University of Bristol and published his doctoral thesis in 1971.

Duncan returned to Australia on 25 March 1972 to take up a lectureship in law at the University of Adelaide, moving into Lincoln College in North Adelaide.

== Murder ==
Around six weeks after Duncan's arrival in Adelaide, he was thrown from the southern bank of the River Torrens, near Kintore Avenue, and drowned. In 1988, Julian Clarke gave a police statement about what he saw at the beat on the banks of the River Torrens in 1972. He stated that after hearing screaming, he saw a group of men throw two other men in the river. He said members of the group then punched him and told him to "fuck off" before the same happened to him.

Julian Clarke later told Ivan Felisatti he saw three police officers attack Duncan: "Two of them held Dr Duncan and Julian heard bones breaking and the men shouting."

As homosexuality was still illegal in South Australia at that time, the banks of the Torrens River, or "Number 1 beat" as it was then known, was a popular place for gay or bisexual men to meet. Around 11.00 p.m. on 10 May 1972, Duncan and Roger James (and a third unidentified man) were all thrown by a group of men into the river in separate incidents, and Duncan, being unable to swim, drowned. One of the perpetrators then stripped and entered the river in search of Duncan, but the victim was unable to be found in the murky waters. James suffered a broken ankle and, after crawling to the road, was rescued by a passing driver, Bevan Spencer von Einem (who was later convicted of child murder), who then took him to the Royal Adelaide Hospital.

== Investigations and trial ==
After James and other witnesses declined to identify the attackers and reportedly feared for their lives, the Premier of South Australia, Don Dunstan, offered government protection to witnesses who came forward. Within days of the murder, it was suspected that the group of men who killed Duncan were three senior vice squad police officers. Witnesses claimed that the detectives were also accompanied by a tall civilian, who was never identified.

Public debate was so great that Dunstan permitted Police Commissioner Harold Salisbury to call in detectives from New Scotland Yard to investigate the murder. Their report, written by Detective Chief Superintendent Bob McGowan, which was not made public until tabled in the South Australia parliament in 2002, indicated that vice squad officers Francis John Cawley, Michael Kenneth Clayton, and Brian Edwin Hudson had taken part in the three assaults. The inquiry, described as "a frolic", had failed to find sufficient evidence to prosecute any of the officers due to a lack of witness testimony. Further, the detectives were called upon to give evidence at the coronial inquiry but had refused to answer any of the questions put to them and were subsequently suspended from duty and eventually resigned. The coroner returned an open finding on 5 July 1972, which led to the crown solicitor announcing on 24 October 1972 that he had decided against proceeding with any prosecution.

On 30 July 1985, former vice squad officer Mick O'Shea, who had resigned in 1981, told The Advertiser that the group involved in Duncan's death were vice squad officers and that there was a cover-up to protect them. On 5 February 1986, Cawley, Clayton and Hudson were charged with the manslaughter of Duncan. Cawley and Clayton eventually went to trial in 1988, with both being acquitted of the charges on 30 September after refusing to testify.

During the trial, O'Shea made specific allegations that it was a common practice for vice squad officers to throw homosexual men into the river, that certain members assaulted homosexual men, and that on one occasion they had chased an individual while firing shots. A further allegation was later raised that there had been an attempt to influence a juror to find the two officers charged not guilty. A police task force was set up, reporting to the SA parliament in 1990 that there was insufficient evidence to charge any person with the murder. Repeated calls for a royal commission have been ignored.

In August 2015, on the 40th anniversary of the Criminal Law (Sexual Offences) Act 1975 being passed, SAPOL Police Commissioner Grant Stevens talked publicly about the murder, saying that the case remained open and that A$200,000 reward was on offer for information leading to a conviction. He also said that SAPOL was now an inclusive police force and had "an excellent relationship with the gay community."

== Legal impact ==
The murder attracted national media coverage, and public outrage resulted in Duncan being held up as a martyr by the gay rights movement. Gay and feminist activists, led by Jon Ruwoldt, opened the Doctor Duncan Revolution Bookshop as an organising centre in June 1974, at King William Road Hyde Park, also selling political books by mail-order, which fulfilled its purpose and closed in May 1977. When closed, the stock was transferred to International Bookshop in Melbourne.

As a result of the media attention, Murray Hill, a Liberal Party member of the Legislative Council, introduced a bill on 26 July 1972 to amend the Criminal Law Consolidation Act (1935–1971) that criminalised homosexuality. The amendment was assented to on 9 November 1972, however, a further amendment weakened it to only allow a legal defence for homosexual acts committed in private. In 1973, the Labor member for Elizabeth, Peter Duncan (no relation), introduced the Criminal Law (Sexual Offences) Bill into Parliament which, although passed by the Lower House, was defeated twice in the Legislative Council.

On 27 August 1975, the unaltered bill was again introduced, defeated, reintroduced, defeated, reintroduced a third time and passed, all on the same day, making South Australia the first Australian state to fully decriminalise homosexuality.

== Memorials and legacy ==
Memorial for George Duncan

Duncan is buried in Centennial Park Cemetery. In November 2022, a ceremony was held at the grave to mark 50 years since Duncan's death, and the lease on the grave was extended for a further 50 years by the university.

On 10 May 2002, the 30th anniversary of Duncan's death, a memorial monument was erected near the site of the murder. The inscription reads:

"In memory of Dr George Duncan, whose death by drowning on 10th May, 1972 near here, at the hands of persons unconvicted, precipitated homosexual law reform in South Australia, making it the first state in Australia in 1975 to decriminalise homosexual relations between consenting adults. We will remember him."

Also on 10 May 2002, Radio Adelaide broadcast a feature documentary The Killing of Dr George. On 1 October 2002, the South Australia Institute of Justice Studies awarded a special commendation to Radio Adelaide, praising the documentary for its historical significance and inclusion of comment from people who had been gay activists at the time of Duncan's death.

The national George Duncan Memorial Award was inaugurated in 2004. The award is presented for an outstanding piece of work contributing to legal reform and the betterment of the Australian lesbian, gay, queer, bisexual, transgender or intersex community. In 2005, Baden Offord won the award for his 2003 book Homosexual Rights as Human Rights.

In 2016, SBS highlighted the case in a five-part podcast series called Out of Sight: The Untold Story of Adelaide's Gay Hate Murders, narrated by journalist Mark Whittaker. The series also connected to SBS's Deep Water and documentaries about other unsolved anti-gay hate crimes in Sydney.

In 2020, the City of Adelaide installed a new sign to honour Duncan's memory next to the 2002 memorial next to the Torrens. Headed by the words "Dr Duncan: A life tragically lost but a state transformed", the sign includes details of the story, and a large photograph of Duncan.

In January 2022, the University of Adelaide began to offer the Dr Duncan Memorial Scholarship, worth A$5,000, to an undergraduate law student in need of financial assistance. The scholarship was established by a group of donors who were supported by a grant from the Government of South Australia.

In February and March 2022, the Adelaide Festival debuted Watershed: The Death of Dr Duncan, a modern oratorio about Duncan's life, death, and its impact. The work was set to music composed by Joseph Twist, with a libretto by Australian playwrights Alana Valentine and Christos Tsiolkas, directed by Neil Armfield and performed by the Adelaide Chamber Singers. It received good reviews, and in November 2022 won the Ruby Award for Outstanding Work within a Festival.

On 10 May 2022, the 50th anniversary of his death, a memorial event was held at the footbridge near where he died, and the freshly repainted Pride Walk (aka Rainbow Walk) in Light Square was officially unveiled. That same year, Adelaide historian Tim Reeves published The Death of Dr Duncan, a book describing his decades of investigation into the case.

== See also ==
- Gay panic defence
- List of unsolved murders (1900–1979)
