= Bevan Spencer von Einem =

Australian child murderer (1946–2025)

- Von Einem appearing in court in 2008
- Born: 29 May 1946
- Died: December 2025 (aged 79); Northfield, South Australia, Australia
- Other name: Bevan von Einem
- Conviction: Murder
- Penalty: Life imprisonment (36-year non-parole period)

Details
- Victims: Convicted of 1, suspected of 5+
- Span of crimes: 1979–1983
- Country: Australia
- State: South Australia
- Date apprehended: 3 November 1983

Bevan Spencer von Einem (29 May 1946 – 5 December 2025) was an Australian convicted child murderer and suspected serial killer from Adelaide, South Australia. An accountant by profession, he was convicted in 1984 for the murder of 15-year-old Adelaide teenager Richard Kelvin, the son of local television and radio personality Rob Kelvin. Von Einem served life imprisonment. He was in G Block of Yatala Prison for decades, but was transferred to Port Augusta Prison in the north of the state in 2007.

Von Einem was a suspect in several other murders, but he was never charged in those cases. He died of natural causes in prison at the age of 79.

== Early years ==
Bevan Spencer von Einem first came to public attention in May 1972 when he came to the aid of Roger James, a gay man who had been thrown into the River Torrens during the murder of George Duncan. A group of police officers were suspected of these crimes, but nobody was charged or convicted.

The area was a popular beat where gay men would meet covertly (homosexual acts were illegal in South Australia until 1975). Duncan, a British law lecturer who had arrived in Australia only seven weeks before, died of drowning because he was unable to swim. Roger James was also thrown into the river and suffered a broken leg. James managed to crawl to the roadside, where von Einem saw him and rendered assistance by driving him to the Royal Adelaide Hospital. James recovered from his injuries.

== Murder of Richard Kelvin ==
Richard Dallas Kelvin (1 December 1967 – c. 10 July 1983) was the son of Rob Kelvin, a long-time television news presenter for Adelaide station NWS 9. Kelvin was murdered by von Einem on or around 10 July 1983 in Adelaide, South Australia after having been abducted, held captive, sexually abused, drugged and tortured for five weeks. He was 15 years old at the time of his death.

At approximately 6:15 p.m. on 5 June 1983, von Einem (likely along with other unknown persons) abducted Kelvin near the intersection of Margaret Street & Peppertree Lane, North Adelaide, just 60 metres (200 ft) from Kelvin's home around the corner in Ward Street. He had just seen off a friend at a nearby bus stop on the corner of O'Connell and Marian Streets, North Adelaide, after they had earlier that afternoon played football in a nearby park. He was expected to return home immediately for dinner. A witness, a security guard living in Margaret Street, had heard cries for help, car doors slamming, and a car with a noisy exhaust speeding away. Kelvin had a dog collar around his neck, which may have attracted von Einem's attention.

Police made a wide-ranging search, and the case earned extensive media coverage that included a full-page missing person poster in The Advertiser on 28 June (that unfortunately had contained a false lead given by the public to police). There was a $5,000 reward offered by the State Government two days after his disappearance (quickly raised to $15,000 a week later), which led to numerous tips and possible sightings provided by the public in the weeks after.

Kelvin's whereabouts were unknown until his clothed body was found seven weeks later on 24 July 1983, by a geologist searching for moss rocks with his family, alongside a dirt airstrip near One Tree Hill in the Adelaide Hills (to the north-east of the city and close to where relatives of von Einem lived). Little effort was put into concealing Kelvin's body; he was found wearing the same Channel 9 shirt, blue jeans and white Adidas sneakers which he wore on the day of his abduction, together with the dog collar fitted around his neck.

Richard Kelvin's headstone at Centennial Park Cemetery

The autopsy revealed that Kelvin had most likely died from massive blood loss from an anal injury, probably caused by the insertion of a blunt object with a tapered neck, such as a beer bottle, and that he had suffered bruising and injuries from blows to his head, to the left side of his back and also to his right buttock as well as a fractured front tooth which occurred either just before or just after death. Analysis of his bloodstream revealed traces of alcohol and five hypnotic drugs: Mandrax (methaqualone, also known as Quaalude), Noctec (chloral hydrate), Amytal (amobarbital, also called sodium amytal), Valium (diazepam) and Rohypnol (flunitrazepam).

With Mandrax being regulated by the Central Board of Health in 1978, use of the drug had somewhat declined in Australia and police began sifting through prescriptions. During their search they found a prescription for Mandrax issued to a 'B. von Einem', a name familiar to police as he had been questioned previously over the deaths of three young men and the alleged sexual assault of another.

Four days after Richard Kelvin's body was discovered, von Einem was questioned by the police about the murder. He initially claimed that he had not seen Kelvin and had no knowledge of his whereabouts, stating that on the night of abduction he had been in bed with the flu and was off work for the next week. Police also searched his home in the northern Adelaide suburb of Paradise, where he lived with his mother, who was an invalid, and seized a bottle of the sedative drug Mandrax. Von Einem admitted that the drugs were his and said that he used them to help him sleep. He denied having any other drugs in his possession, but police also seized a bottle of Noctec, another sedative drug which was concealed on a ledge behind his wardrobe.

Von Einem allowed police to take hair and blood samples, as well as carpet fibres and other materials for testing. Forensic investigators were able to match the many fibres found on Kelvin's clothing to those taken from von Einem's home, along with hairs found which matched those belonging to him. Forensics also determined that Kelvin was murdered between 8 July and 11 July 1983 and was dumped at the airstrip no later than the 11th. With sufficient evidence to indicate that Kelvin was at von Einem's home around the time of his death, police arrested and charged von Einem with murder on 3 November 1983. Von Einem still denied ever coming into contact with Kelvin.

The committal hearing to determine if there was sufficient evidence for von Einem to stand trial for murder began on 20 February 1984. Faced with irrefutable evidence from prosecutors that Kelvin had been in his company, von Einem chose to amend his initial statement and admitted that he had been in contact with Kelvin on the night of 5 June 1983. Von Einem said that he was driving along O'Connell Street in North Adelaide looking for a parking spot in order to buy some fish and chips for dinner. While looking for a parking spot in a side street, von Einem said that he had nearly run over Kelvin as he jogged in from his side. Von Einem stated he thought Kelvin had bisexual tendencies and said that the two of them then had a conversation about problems Kelvin had been having at school, and Kelvin willingly got into the car and they drove to von Einem's home. This answered the question of how fibres from von Einem's carpet had got onto Kelvin's clothes. To answer evidence about how fibres from von Einem's bed had come to be on Kelvin's clothes, von Einem stated that the two of them had sat on his bed and played with the large gold harp which he kept in his bedroom. Finally, to answer evidence about how fibres from von Einem's cardigan had got onto Kelvin, von Einem stated that he had put his arm around Kelvin and hugged him because Kelvin was upset about how his peers had been bullying him at school. With all the fibres being accounted for with his new story, von Einem concluded his statement by saying that Kelvin had stayed for two hours before von Einem dropped him off in the Adelaide CBD near the Royal Adelaide Hospital and gave Kelvin $20 to pay for a taxi home.

Despite the intricate details of von Einem's alibi and his version of events, his story contradicted his initial statement of his whereabouts on 5 June 1983, when he said he had been in bed with the flu. Furthermore, the quantity of fibres on Kelvin's clothes was far too large to suggest that Kelvin was in his company for only two hours. Given these facts, on 25 May 1984, Magistrate Nick Manos ordered von Einem to stand trial for the murder of Kelvin.

== Trial ==
The trial against von Einem for the murder of Kelvin opened at the Supreme Court of South Australia on 15 October 1984 before Mr. Justice White. A jury of 12 people (seven women and five men) was selected and agreed upon by the prosecution and defence. Von Einem pleaded not guilty; his defence was led by barrister Barry Jennings, who was assisted by Helena Jasinski, who had been von Einem's solicitor from the start of the police investigation of him in the murder during the previous year. The prosecution was led by Brian Martin QC (later the Chief Justice of the Supreme Court of the Northern Territory), with assistance from Paul Rofe QC (who went on to be Director of the Department of Public Prosecutions). For the prosecution, it was a matter of proving von Einem's guilt (along with that of unknown persons) by presenting the strong scientific evidence that had been gathered during the investigation, and disproving von Einem's story of being in contact with Kelvin on the night of 5 June 1983. For the defence, it was a case of trying to make von Einem's story hold up in court, and raising doubts about his ability to keep Kelvin captive for five weeks and committing the murder.

The prosecution opened their case with the jury being taken to the various sites around Adelaide that were important in the trial, and over the first week they called various witnesses to the stand. Kelvin's parents, girlfriend and best friend were called to testify that he was an average 15-year-old who would not willingly get into a car with a stranger, was heterosexual with no homosexual or bisexual tendencies, and that he had been wearing the dog collar as a joke. People living close to the Kelvin's then testified that they had heard noises and commotion corresponding to the abduction taking place on the night of 5 June at around 6 p.m. Forensic pathologists were called to testify about the injuries to Kelvin's head and anus, and the likely cause of his death, and pharmacists gave evidence of the excessive amount of different hypnotic drugs which von Einem had been prescribed (5,872 tablets and capsules of six different brands of drugs between 15 December 1978 and 10 August 1983), and showed that von Einem had often had prescriptions for drugs issued from three different chemists on the same day or during the same weeks. Various police officers who worked on the case testified to their investigation of von Einem since they had first questioned him about the murder, as well as their visit to von Einem's home, where a police officer claimed that von Einem's bedroom appeared to have been cleaned "extensively".

Forensic scientists were called next to give evidence first on when Kelvin had died and when his body had been dumped in the Adelaide Hills area, and a leading entomologist claimed, from the larvae cycle of flies that were on the body, and comparing these to the larvae cycle of flies on a dead dog that was nearby, that Kelvin's body must have been dumped beside the airstrip near Kersbrook on 10 July 1983. Other forensic scientists were called to testify about the hair and fibre samples collected that were linked to von Einem himself and his home. Hairs from von Einem were found on and inside Kelvin's clothing and of 925 fibre samples found on Kelvin's clothing, 250 came from von Einem's home environment, with just seven from Kelvin's home. The scientists stated that if von Einem's story was true, then there should be a very small amount or even none of the fibres and hair samples from that night still on Kelvin's clothing some 36 hours later, let alone five weeks later. Faced with such damning scientific evidence, the defence tried to counter this during cross-examination by floating a possible theory that after von Einem's last contact with Kelvin, he had been abducted by other people, who had stored his clothing for five weeks before murdering him and re-dressing him. While the forensic scientists conceded that this was a possible scenario, under renewed cross-examination by the prosecution, they noted it would be unlikely given the science of how fibres and hair are transferred from surface to surface over time. The prosecution then rested its case.

The defence opted for von Einem to give an unsworn statement from the dock, rather than give sworn evidence from the witness box. In his unsworn statement, von Einem detailed his alibi with what he claimed happened between 5 June and 11 July 1983. He again claimed that on 5 June he had picked up Kelvin in North Adelaide, had driven him to his home, and later had dropped him off in the Adelaide CBD. He also claimed that he was sick with the flu for the next week after that and did not return to work until 14 June. Von Einem was vague on his activities after that; however, he did remember what he did on 10 July, the day the body was dumped on the airstrip. He said that he was at a relative's birthday party with his mother for most of that evening, and after dropping off a friend on the way home, had gone straight to bed and then to work the next day. He also addressed the issue of the noisy exhaust on the car heard during the abduction of Kelvin, by stating that the exhaust on his Ford Falcon (which von Einem had sold on 16 July 1983, purportedly to raise money for his overseas trip) was less than two years old and in good condition. He closed his unsworn statement by again claiming his innocence.

The defence then called various witnesses in an attempt to corroborate von Einem's story. The witnesses included colleagues and friends who testified to him being unwell and at home during the first week of Kelvin's captivity. Also testifying for the defence was the bushwalker, who while walking his dogs through the airstrip had discovered Kelvin's body on 24 July. The purchaser of von Einem's Ford Falcon detailed the condition of the car, and the relative who hosted the birthday party on 10 July stated that von Einem and his mother had arrived there at 5:30 p.m. and left at 10:30 p.m. Photographs of von Einem at the party were also tendered to the court. Finally, the defence called von Einem's mother to testify about her son's activities over the weekend upon which Kelvin was kidnapped. Under cross-examination, the prosecution were able to show inconsistencies in her current testimony compared to her earlier statements to police about von Einem's whereabouts on the weekend of 4–5 June, which weakened the defence case considerably as this highlighted von Einem's change the previous February of his account of what happened on the night of 5 June 1983.

In their summation, the prosecution stated that the evidence they presented proved that von Einem's story was full of lies and inconsistencies, and that he did murder (with the help of others) Kelvin. They also stated that his admission that he had picked up Kelvin showed that he was in contact with him on 5 June; that the fibres and hairs proved that von Einem was with him at the time of just before and/or at the time of death; and that the drugs proved von Einem was with Kelvin in between those times. The prosecution also answered the doubts raised by the defence about when on 10 July the body was dumped at the airstrip by suggesting that von Einem could have dumped the body sometime very late on 10 July or in the early morning of 11 July before going to work for the day.

The defence stated in their summary that the prosecution had failed to prove beyond reasonable doubt that von Einem was guilty of murder and also were not able to establish the exact cause of Kelvin's death, so therefore the jury must give von Einem the benefit of the doubt.

Justice White then gave his summation of the trial, and in the early afternoon of 5 November 1984, the jury retired to consider their verdict.

== Conviction ==
After 7.5 hours of deliberation and amid cheers and applause from a packed public gallery, Von Einem was found guilty of the murder of Richard Kelvin and was sentenced to life at Yatala Labour Prison with a 24-year non-parole period. Mr. Justice White stated "The horrendous nature of this crime has added a new dimension to murder committed in this state. I have no doubt Von Einem was party to a cruel, bizarre and long-standing imprisonment by sexual deviants."

The Attorney-General of South Australia immediately appealed the leniency of the non-parole period, and on 29 March 1985 the Court of Criminal Appeal in South Australia increased the non-parole period to 36 years, a record at the time in that state. The earliest von Einem could be released on parole was therefore on 31 October 2007 (after allowing for the fact that a third of the non-parole period could be taken off for good behaviour in prison). Then-Chief Justice Len King refused to refrain from fixing a non-parole period but said the "enormity and depravity of the crime" required an increased period in prison.

Von Einem's defence team (now consisting of barrister David Peek with assistance from Helena Jasinski) appealed the conviction to the Court of Criminal Appeal in South Australia and requested that a new trial be set. The basis for this appeal was the evidence given about Kelvin's heterosexuality, the references to von Einem's own homosexuality through the trial and the negative impact that might have had on the jury, and also how Mr. Justice White in his summation did not include reference to the testimony given by von Einem's relative about his attendance at the birthday party on the day Kelvin's body was dumped. The Court of Criminal Appeal rejected the appeal, saying that the trial was conducted fairly and justly throughout and that White's summation "accurately reflected the relative strength and weakness of the cases for the prosecution and the defence".

== Suspected involvement in other murders ==
Von Einem was the leading suspect in the unsolved murders of four other young men between 1979 and 1982, and police continued to pursue leads on those cases in the years after his murder conviction. The four murdered were Alan Barnes in June 1979, Neil Muir in August 1979, Peter Stogneff in August 1981 and Mark Langley in February 1982. All four of these victims had similar anal injuries as those found on Richard Kelvin, and are collectively referred to as "The Family Murders".

In February 1988, the State Coroner at the time in South Australia, Kevin Ahern, ordered an inquest into the deaths of these four young men, and on 24 March 1988, the State Coroner in his findings stated that the manner and circumstances in which the four were murdered were very similar to that in the case of Kelvin, particularly the murders of Barnes and Langley. The reward for any information leading to an arrest for the murders was set to $250,000 in 1988, and later increased to $500,000 in September 1989.

Von Einem later spoke to The Advertiser for the first time since his conviction in 1984, maintaining his innocence in the murder of Richard Kelvin and stating that "highly-placed people" were involved in the killings. The comments provoked a rare response from Kelvin's father, newsreader Rob Kelvin, who stated that Von Einem was a "seedy, middle-aged deviate" and that "if he were for one second to admit and acknowledge his deeds, he would find life untenable".

Police focused on building a case against Von Einem for the murders of Alan Barnes and Mark Langley, since these two, at least, had been drugged before their deaths and could convincingly be tied to the already-prosecuted murder of Richard Kelvin. The prosecution's case relied on the evidence given by an informant known only as "Mr. B", who claimed he was in the company of Barnes and Von Einem at the time just before Barnes's murder. "Mr B" also gave startling allegations of Von Einem being involved in the unexplained Beaumont children disappearance in 1966, as well as the disappearance of two girls at the Adelaide Oval in 1973. However, it turned out to be impossible to corroborate these allegations. Police were ultimately unable to make much of "Mr. B's" allegations, especially since he seemed more than willing to implicate Von Einem in particularly heinous crimes, but avoided going into any significant detail. The prosecution, on the advice of the Attorney-General, eventually entered a nolle prosequi for the murder charge, and the murders of Alan Barnes, Neil Muir, Peter Stogneff, and Mark Langley remain unresolved.

As of 2020, the reward for any information leading to a conviction in these murders is $1 million.

== Life in prison ==
=== 2006 ===
On 29 January 2006, the ABC reported that von Einem was currently being investigated for allegedly raping an inmate several times at Yatala Labour Prison.

On 29 October 2006, The Australian reported that von Einem had been selling hand-painted greeting cards to prison officers for $20 each.

=== 2007 ===
On 4 February 2007, the ABC reported that von Einem had been charged over commercial dealings during his incarceration, including selling hand-painted greeting cards.

On 14 June 2007, the ABC reported that von Einem had been charged with producing and possessing child pornography, with police alleging that he had handwritten three fictitious stories describing sexual acts between a child and a man. His lawyer believed a handwriting analysis would clear von Einem.

On 27 July 2007, it was announced that von Einem had been transferred from the maximum security B-Division of Yatala Labour Prison to Port Augusta Prison.

On 11 August 2007, The Australian reported that detectives were calling for information to establish the identity of a young man seen in the Seven Network's news archive, showing police searching a storm water drain in the days after the Beaumont Children's disappearance. The man bore a striking resemblance to a youthful von Einem. On 13 August 2007, the Seven Network followed this with a story that the man standing next to the Einem lookalike in their archived film matched the police sketch of the suspect seen with the Beaumonts at the beach on the day of their disappearance.

On 1 November 2007, the ABC reported that after 24 years behind bars, von Einem was now eligible to apply for parole. However, South Australian Premier Mike Rann had vowed to enforce new legislation to ensure von Einem would never leave prison alive.

=== 2008 ===
On 28 March 2008, the ABC reported that the child pornography found in von Einem's cell had been determined not to have been written by him and that fingerprints did not match. Defence lawyer Sam Abbott said he expected the Director of Public Prosecutions to drop the most serious charge of producing the material and, if not, he would argue there was no case to answer. It was also announced that von Einem had been excused from attending his court hearings so that he could avoid an "unpleasant" three-hour drive with other inmates.

On 2 April 2008, the Sunday Mail reported that detectives launched a new investigation into the Family Murders including interviewing and DNA-testing associates of von Einem.

=== 2009 ===
On 24 June 2009, the ABC reported that von Einem had been sentenced to an extra three months in jail for having child pornography in his cell. However, the Supreme Court judge later declined to extend Von Einem's non-parole term.

=== 2019 ===
On 14 September 2019, The Advertiser reported that crime author Debi Marshall had interviewed von Einem at Port Augusta prison. Despite being incarcerated for decades, von Einem reportedly still denied being a killer; however, he admitted to picking up hitchhikers, but never harming them.

=== 2021 ===
On 2 September 2021, News.com.au reported that investigative journalist Debi Marshall once again interviewed von Einem at Port Augusta prison. Upon questioning von Einem about Richard Kelvin's murder, she reported that "a psychopath came out".

== Death ==
On 25 November 2025, the ABC reported that von Einem had been rushed from Port Augusta to the Yatala Labour Prison infirmary, where he remained in a serious condition, and only had a short time to live. Shortly afterwards, South Australian major crime detectives reportedly visited Yatala Labour Prison to speak with von Einem on his deathbed.

Von Einem's death at the age of 79 was announced on 6 December 2025. The State Coroner determined his cause of death to be metastatic lung cancer (lung cancer that had spread to other parts of the body) "on a background of chronic obstructive pulmonary disease, atherosclerotic vascular disease and Type 2 diabetes". Von Einem had been diagnosed with lung cancer in September 2025.

== See also ==
- List of serial killers by number of victims
