= Mobilong Prison =

Prison in Murray Bridge, South Australia

Coordinates: 35°6′47″S 139°14′2″E

- Interactive map of Mobilong Prison
- Location: Maurice Road, Murray Bridge, South Australia
- Security class: Low to Medium Security
- Capacity: 472 males
- Opened: 1987
- Managed by: Department for Correctional Services

Mobilong Prison is an Australian low and medium security prison for men located at Murray Bridge, South Australia. It has a capacity of 472 prisoners, housed in cells and cottage style units. The centre provides education and vocational training, as well as drug and alcohol counselling.

Opened in 1987 after the closure of Adelaide Jail. It is an open campus prison, the first of its kind when it was built.
