= Wilhelm Tenhaeff =

Dutch parapsychologist (1894–1981)

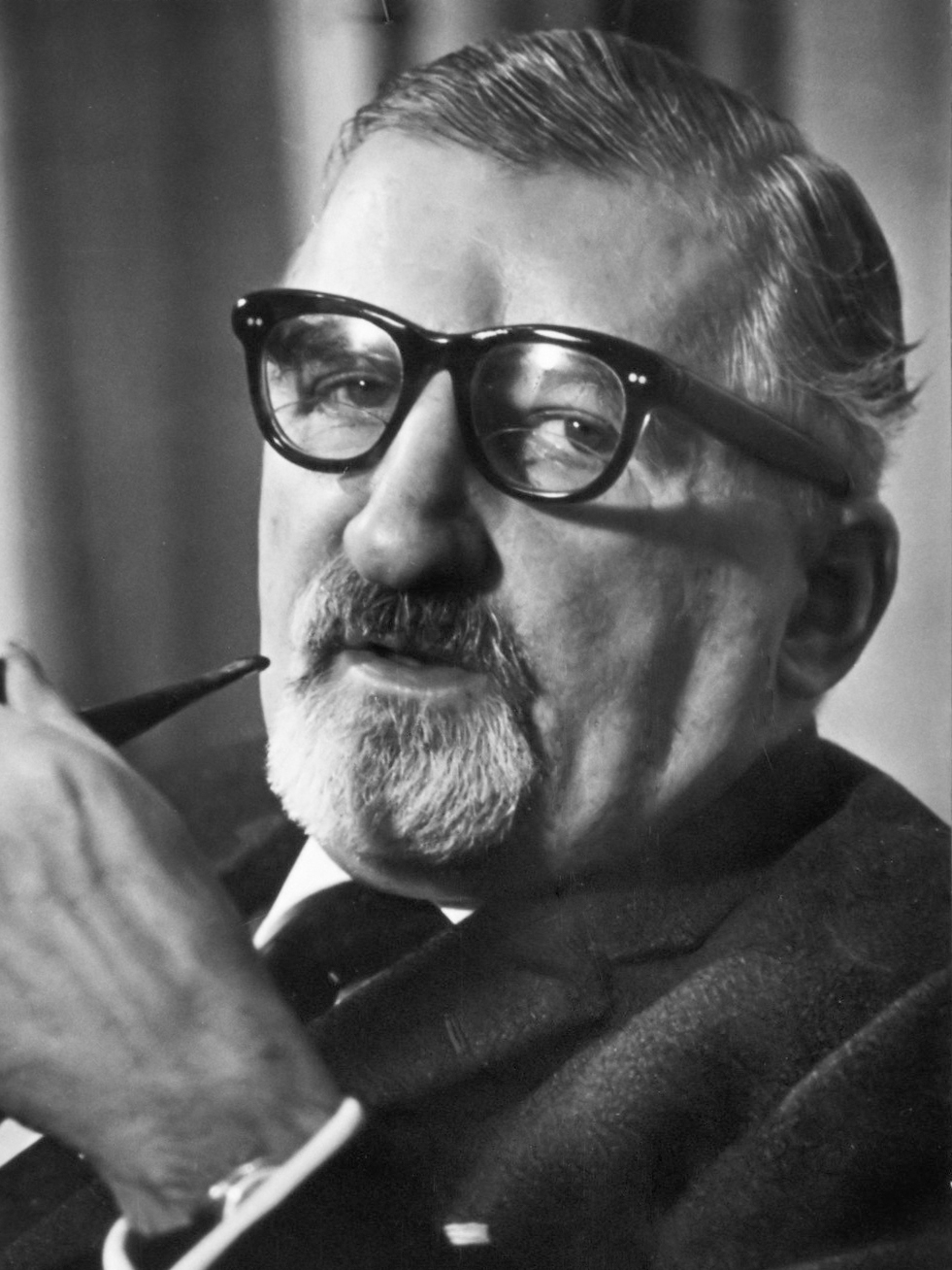
- Wilhelm Tenhaeff in 1964
- Born: Wilhelm Heinrich Carl Tenhaeff; 18 January 1894; Rotterdam, Netherlands
- Died: 9 July 1981 (aged 87); Utrecht, Netherlands
- Spouse(s): Johanna Pieternella Hoffman (m. 1919; div. 1921) Johanna Jacoba Hemmes (m. 1926; died 1963) Nicolauda Geertruida Louwerens (m. 1979)

Academic background
- Education: Utrecht University
- Thesis: Paragnosie en Einfuehlen. Bijdrage tot het vraagstuk der genialiteit. (1933)
- Doctoral advisor: F.M.J.A. Roels

Academic work
- Discipline: psychologist
- Sub-discipline: parapsychology
- Institutions: Utrecht University

Wilhelm Heinrich Carl Tenhaeff (18 January 1894 – 9 July 1981) was a Dutch parapsychologist. From 1953 to 1979, Tenhaeff was a "special professor" of parapsychology at Utrecht University, one of the first dedicated professors of parapsychology in the world, after having taught there as privaatdocent from 1933 onward. He became viewed as a pioneer of parapsychological research. He also achieved fame through his scientific collaboration with self-proclaimed psychic Gerard Croiset. Tenhaeff and his work were heavily criticized by mainstream psychologists as careless and pseudoscientific throughout his life, and much of his work with Croiset was criticized as fraudulent after Tenhaeff's death.

== Early life ==
Wilhelm Heinrich Carl Tenhaeff was born on 18 January 1894 in Rotterdam to Carl Albert Johann Tenhaeff, the director of a trading firm on the Rhine, and Maria Christina van Noorden. The Tenhaeff family originated from the province of Zeeland, but had lived in Germany near the river Weser for generations, his father having been born in Ruhrort before moving to the Netherlands to establish his business. Wilhelm Tenhaeff was initially supposed to enter into his father's business, studying trade at secondary school for two years and, against his own wishes, working for his father's firm for several years.

At the age of 17, Tenhaeff first became interested in parapsychology due to the paranormal abilities of a mother of a secondary school classmate, after which he decided to devote himself to studying similar phenomena. In 1914, he first visited a clairvoyant. During the Dutch general mobilization in World War I, Tenhaeff served time in the Royal Netherlands Army. In 1920, Tenhaeff became involved with a group of mesmerists, including Felix Ortt, and attempted to subject their magnetic healing to scientific study, but was ultimately unsuccessful.

== Academic career ==
In 1925, Tenhaeff began studying psychology at Utrecht University, passing his doctoral exams in 1928. That same year, he founded the Tijdschrift voor Parapsychologie, a journal dedicated to parapsychology, in collaboration with fellow parapsychologist Paul Dietz. During this period, he became involved with the Study Association for Psychical Research (Studievereeniging voor Psychical Research, SPR). In 1933, Tenhaeff finished his PhD under professor Franciscus Roels with a doctoral thesis on "Paragnosie en ''Einfuehlen''. Bijdrage tot het vraagstuk der genialiteit."

Tenhaeff had begun teaching an introductory course to psychology as a teaching assistant in 1932, and after obtaining his PhD he became a privaatdocent teaching parapsychology at Utrecht University. During the German occupation of the Netherlands, the SPR was shut down and Tenhaeff was forced to go into hiding.

In 1953, Tenhaeff was appointed "special professor" of parapsychology at Utrecht University, one of the first in the world, and became head of the Parapsychological Institute. His inaugural lecture on 5 October concerned the case of a 17th-century "sudden paragnostic" experience, as described in the historical work of François Valentyn, about a case in which a sailor from Enkhuizen has a dream in which he foresaw the death by drowning of admiral Arnold de Vlaming van Oudtshoorn in a shipwreck on the night of the admiral's death. This story was criticized by Paul Spigt, who identified errors in Tenhaeff's retelling. These included his misidentification of the person who experienced the dream, attributed by Valentyn as governor-general of the Dutch East Indies Joan Maetsuycker, questioned the reliability of Valentyn's work and pointed out that the manner and timing of De Vlaming van Oudtshoorn's death was unknown, meaning the story could not be used as evidence of psychic phenomena. In a response, Tenhaeff acknowledged his misidentification, but asserted he had not meant to use the story as evidence of parapsychological ability but that telepathy was known about during the 17th century. Tenhaeff would later go on to relay the same anecdote in a 1961 article in the womens magazine Margriet.

In his work, Tenhaeff sought to put the research of paranormal phenomena on a more scientific footing by subjecting self-proclaimed psychics to scientific evaluations, and became seen as a pioneer in the field of parapsychology. Throughout his career, his fellow psychologists increasingly began to view Tenhaeff's methods as outdated. Tenhaeff in turn criticized the work of his contemporaries, including other parapsychologists like Joseph Banks Rhine, as "a boring affair", being in his eyes too quantitative and materialistic.

Tenhaeff became a popular lecturer and writer on paranormal phenomena, thereby popularizing the field. He also supported the psychic claims of Uri Geller, and stated his desire to subject Geller to parapsychological experiments. In his later years, Tenhaeff became a scientific believer in an afterlife, referring to "a series of converging arguments" for the "possibility bordering on certainty" for its existence, and in reincarnation.

== Collaboration with Gerard Croiset ==
Although Tenhaeff examined hundreds of self-proclaimed psychics throughout his career, his most famous work was with Gerard Croiset, who became famous for his attempts to use his abilities to solve various crimes. The two first met in 1945 after Croiset sought contact with Tenhaeff, showing him a video of Croiset performing healing on patients through the laying on of hands. While research into Croiset's healing abilities was unfruitful, Tenhaeff would have more success subjecting Croiset to a series of "chair experiments", which led Tenhaeff to label Croiset in a 1947 journal article as "a man with extraordinary psychic abilities." This involved Croiset being shown the seating arrangement of a location where he was to speak, and making psychic predictions about the people who would sit in a particular chair. These experiments were criticized by other scientists for their experimental setup as well as for not providing any quantitative results.

Tenhaeff labeled Croiset as the Mozart or Beethoven of the clairvoyant world. After Croiset's death, Tenhaeff criticized the personality cult that had been built up around Croiset, stating that he was the one who had made Croiset internationally famous. Croiset himself criticized Tenhaeff as having seen him merely as an object of study, and disliked Tenhaeff's dismissal of Croiset's intellectual writings. Croiset and Tenhaeff developed a symbiotic relationship despite their differences; Croiset using Tenhaeff's academic credentials as a means to gain scientific legitimacy and Tenhaeff making use of Croiset's fame in his quest to become the "Freud of parapsychology." Tenhaeff also served as a consultant on the first English-language biography of Croiset written by American journalist Jack Harrison Pollack. Their scientific collaboration would last until Croiset's death in 1980.

In 1981 and 1982, journalist Piet Hein Hoebens wrote two articles which were later published in the Skeptical Inquirer, in which he critically examined Tenhaeff's work with Croiset and Tenhaeff's reporting of these events in popular literature. Cases where Croiset's predictions had failed which Tenhaeff was unable to explain away as examples of "misdirected ESP" were generally ignored completely. Hoebens described several criminal cases which had been viewed by Tenhaeff as dispositive evidence of Croiset's psychic abilities, noting clear inconsistencies when comparing Tenhaeff's retelling to the primary evidence. In the 1953 case of Dirk Zwaene in the town of Velsen for instance, where Croiset had, according to an English biography using Tenhaeff as a source. used his psychic powers to predict the location of a drowned boy's body, Tenhaeff had strategically left out vaguenesses or errors Croiset had made in his predictions prior to the boy's discovery, such as the day he would be found and the injuries he had sustained. The account also differed markedly from the one reported in a case report in a journal edited by Tenhaeff in 1955.

In another case, Hoebens discovered that Tenhaeff had lied directly about Croiset's psychic predictions after listening to tape recordings of interviews with Croiset, in what Hoebens described as a case of "patent fraud." The case involved Croiset being alleged to have provided evidence leading to the arrest of a police agent for arson soon after Croiset's testimony. After contacting the police department directly, Hoebens was given access to taped recordings proving Tenhaeff had lied in a scientific article in a West German journal. Tenhaeff had either distorted or in one case wholly fabricated predictions made by Croiset to better fit the perpetrator's profile, and had stated that Croiset's predictions had taken place just before the arrest despite having been made several years prior. After Hoebens called Tenhaeff to allow him to respond, Tenhaeff shouted insults at him through the phone before hanging up. In other writings, Tenhaeff himself wrote that most of Croiset's cases were of little use to the police, and were "of value solely from the parapsychological angle" as scientific case studies.

== Later life ==
Tenhaeff's authoritarian personality led to conflicts in the later part of his career, with several parapsychologists splitting from the SPR in 1960 over dissatisfaction with Tenhaeff's leadership and scientific work. In 1964, Utrecht University announced it was to seek a successor for Tenhaeff, who would then become a regular professor of parapsychology. In 1969 however, conflicts erupted over the university's intention to appoint an experimental psychologist to the position, which was seen as an infringement of the right of a professor to decide their own research methods. After the university announced the Swedish parapsychologist Martin Johnson as Tenhaeff's successor, Tenhaeff denounced Johnson as "an amateur, a bungler in the field of parapsychology." Tenhaeff refused to give up his seat, and in 1973 Johnson was appointed as regular professor of parapsychology at Utrecht University, indirectly criticizing Tenhaeff's methods as outdated during his inaugural speech.

Tenhaeff remained a special professor at Utrecht University until 1978, when he was succeeded as special professor by Henri van Praag. After his retirement, Tenhaeff remained active as a writer and public lecturer on parapsychology. Wilhelm Tenhaeff died on 9 July 1981 in Utrecht.

== Personal life ==
Tenhaeff was married three times. His first marriage was to Johanna Pieternella Hoffman on 5 February 1919, but the couple divorced two years later, after which he married Johanna Jacoba Hemmes on 4 June 1926. After her death in 1963 Tenhaeff remarried to Nicolauda Geertruida Louwerens on 19 June 1979.

Tenhaeff was a Freemason from 1938.
