= Adelaide Pre-Release Centre =

Prison in Northfield, Australia

Coordinates: 34°50′39″S 138°37′43″E

- Interactive map of Adelaide Pre-Release Centre
- Location: Northfield, South Australia
- Status: Operational
- Security class: Minimum
- Capacity: 104
- Managed by: Department for Correctional Services

The Adelaide Pre-Release Centre is a minimum security Australian prison in the Adelaide suburb of Northfield. It is the main pre-release facility in South Australia for both male and female prisoners.

It has a capacity of 104 prisoners.
