= Joseph Twist =

Australian composer (born 1982)

Joseph Edward Twist (born 1982) is an Australian composer from Gold Coast, Queensland, who resides in the United States.

Twist composed music for other artists including Moby, Missy Higgins, Guy Sebastian, Kate Miller-Heidke, The Idea of North, Chanticleer and The Wiggles and for television shows including Bluey. Twist also composed for films The Jungle Book (2016), Zoolander 2, Baywatch and The Brooklyn Banker. Twist works in a range of genres from ancient vocal music, opera, contemporary orchestral music, jazz, musical theatre and cabaret. Twist's concert works are performed by professional ensembles around the world. He worked in copying and orchestration on Hollywood studio films in Los Angeles with Steven Juliani Music.

== Early years and education ==
Joseph Edward Twist was born in 1982 in Queensland, and grew up on the Gold Coast. He began learning keyboards and then piano with music teacher, Kathryn Bartlett. At primary school, Twist studied piano with Bevan Crabtree and began composing music in his teens.

Twist holds four tertiary degrees in music composition. He completed his Bachelor (2003) and Master of Music at the School of Music, University of Queensland and studied composition under Philip Bračanin, Richard Mills, Nigel Butterley, and subsequently with Ira Newborn and Julia Wolfe in New York City. His doctoral thesis, Folio of Compositions with Critical Commentary: An exploration of musical influences and composing techniques. Critical commentary was delivered to the University of Queensland, School of Music in August 2009. He started another doctorate at Melbourne Conservatorium of Music with Elliott Gyger and Katy Abbott-Kvasnica supervising. He has also studied at the Australian Film Television and Radio School, and New York University. Twist has participated in several film scoring programs around the United States, such as NYU ASCAP Film Scoring Workshop in New York and the ASCAP Film and TV Workshop with Richard Bellis in Los Angeles.

== Career ==
Joseph Twist sang tenor for the Brisbane Chamber Choir (c. 2004), Canticum (c. 2005), National Youth Choir of Australia and Guido's Hand. He was appointed composer-in-residence for Gondwana Voices for 2008.

In 2009 he set Judith Wright's poem, "The Old Prison", to music. Sarah Collins of the Australian Music Centre (AMC) attended the Q150 Celebration Concert at St John's Cathedral in July of that year. The concert included Twist's adaptation of "The Old Prison" performed by the Brisbane Chamber Choir and the Queensland Orchestra String Quartet for its world premiere. Collins observed, "[he] sets the opening simple motif over a drone with wide temporal space between the intervals alluding to the flat, open landscape. This six-note (with anacrusis) opening motif becomes the germ upon which the work is based."

His track, "How shall we sing the Lord's song in a strange land?", was broadcast by the BBC.

In 2019, he was commissioned to arrange Men at Work's hit song Down Under, for the Sydney Symphony Orchestra for use at the State Memorial Service for former Australian Prime Minister Bob Hawke held at the Sydney Opera House on 19 June of that year.

In 2022 a cantata he composed to mark the fiftieth anniversary of the murder of Dr George Duncan premiered at the Adelaide Festival. It was revived by Opera Australia in 2024 for a season of performances at the Sydney Opera House.

== Awards ==
Awards and recognition include:

- ASCAP Jimmy Van Heusen Award 2013
- Chanticleer International Composition Competition
- APRA Professional Development Award (Film and TV Category)
- First-place in the 15th International Choral Composition Competition in 2011

== Works ==
- "Wandering" (2003) – SATB Brisbane Chamber Choir conducted by Graeme Morton, appears on Time and Eternity (2006)
- "Do not Stand at my Grave and Weep" – for SATB Choir. Commissioned by the National Youth Choir of Australia, 2004.
  - "Do not Stand at My Grave and Weep" by Canticum Chamber Choir, Emily Cox (conductor) appears on Choral Highlights – 7th World Symposium on Choral Music (CD album, May 2006)
- "Love Themes" – a set of Madrigals for 6 Voices. Written for The Song Company, 2005. (3mvts)
- "Fanfare for the Common Consumer" (for Orchestra)
- "On the Night Train" for SATB Choir
- "Wandering" for SATB Choir
- "Rain Dream" for SSAA Choir and Piano
- "I Dance Myself to Sleep" for Orchestra
- "How shall we sing the Lord's song in a strange land?" for SATB Choir
- "Ubi Caritas" on Luminescence (2016) by Canticum Chamber Choir
- An Australian Song Cycle for the "Garden of the Soul" programme for Sydney Chamber Choir
- Watershed: The Death of Dr Duncan commissioned by the Adelaide Festival to commemorate 50 years since the infamous drowning of Dr George Ian Ogilvie Duncan.
- Pulse: premiered by the Brisbane Philharmonic Orchestra November 2026.
