= Gerard Croiset =

Dutch psychic (1909–1980)

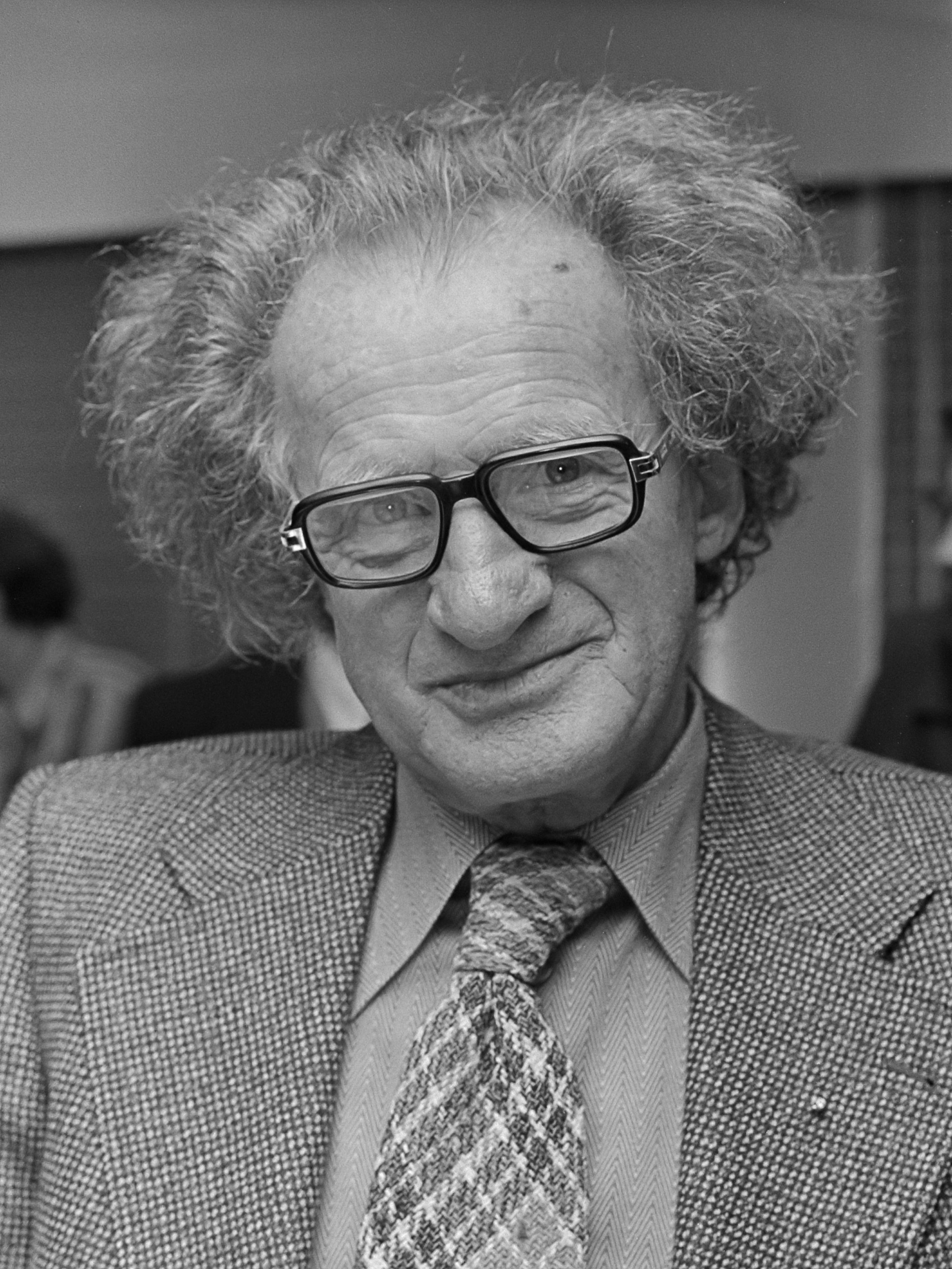
- Croiset in 1976
- Born: Gerard Boekbinder; 10 March 1909; Laren, North Holland, Netherlands
- Died: 20 July 1980 (aged 71); Utrecht, Netherlands
- Occupations: Psychic, parapsychologist, psychometrist

Gerard Croiset (né Boekbinder; March 10, 1909 – July 20, 1980) was a Dutch parapsychologist, psychometrist and psychic. He was often asked to help police detectives trace missing persons, though authenticated successes were few, and compared against the failures, his success rate was ruled no better than chance.

== Background ==
Croiset was born in Laren, North Holland, in March 1909. He said he began to become aware of his alleged gifts while a youth working for a watch repairer, and that on one occasion he held a ruler belonging to his employer and saw events which he related to his employer and which his employer confirmed were accurate.

== Early work ==
After World War II, Croiset was sometimes consulted by Dutch police authorities for cases involving missing persons, or murder. On one occasion he was said to have examined the property of a murdered woman, and provided accurate information relating to her murder, and also gave the name of her murderer. The name matched a man who was being held in connection with the crime. He gained a reputation as a reliable consultant in the area of missing persons, and his fame extended beyond the Netherlands, as anecdotes about his abilities came to be discussed in other countries. He also gained a reputation as a psychic healer, and would allow people to visit him in his clinic for healing sessions.

== Missing persons cases ==
In 1966, he was invited to Australia to aid in an investigation relating to the disappearance of the three Beaumont children, who had disappeared without trace from a beach in Adelaide, South Australia. Although police were skeptical, his expenses were paid by the wealthy property tycoon Con Polites, who was interested in the case, and publicity was such that Croiset's ideas were thought to be worthy of consideration. During his brief stay in Australia, he attracted widespread publicity but failed to find any trace of the missing children.

In January 1970, Croiset participated in the investigation of the kidnapping of Muriel McKay, the wife of publishing tycoon Rupert Murdoch's Deputy Chairman Alick McKay. Croiset was asked by a McKay family friend, Eric Cutler, to help locate her. Croiset said that she was in a white farmhouse in the north or north-east of London, and that nearby to her was another farm and an abandoned aerodrome. He claimed that if she was not found within 14 days she would be dead. Her body was never found. Brothers Arthur and Nazimoodeen Hosein were convicted of her murder — a rare case in British history of a murder conviction without a body. In 1978, the Chief Constable of Devon and Cornwall Police hired Croiset to investigate the disappearance of Genette Tate, but he provided no information of value.

In 1972 he was consulted at various times to assist with the location of a missing aircraft presumed crashed in the Andes mountains. His indications proved to be vague and ultimately incorrect.

Croiset died in Utrecht in 1980, aged 71.

== Evaluation ==
In a 1979 book on Croiset by Wilhelm Tenhaeff, it was reported that he sometimes was consulted in 10 to 12 missing persons cases per week. Of these cases, only a handful could be described as successful, which according to journalist Piet Hein Hoebens suggests Croiset had thousands of failures in his career.

Croiset claimed he helped to solve the case of an assault of a girl in Wierden, the Netherlands. The Chief of Police of Wierden stated however, that the information by Croiset was inaccurate and his communications were not used in the case. In a 1950 rape case, Croiset had forseen that the rapist had "an abnormally big genital organ", but after a suspect was identified who had normally sized genitalia Croiset stated he had in fact been referring to a large basting syringe the suspect used in his job as cook. He was investigated under controlled conditions by The Belgian Committee for the Scientific Investigation of Phenomena Reputed to be Paranormal and they did not find any evidence of psychic ability.

The skeptic James Lett has written:

The truth is that the overwhelming majority of Croiset’s predictions were either vague and nonfalsifiable or simply wrong. Given the fact that Croiset made thousands of predictions during his lifetime, it is hardly surprising that he enjoyed one or two chance “hits”.

The Dutch parapsychologist Wilhelm Tenhaeff has written Croiset had genuine psychic powers due to the information he had given in police cases. However it was discovered that much of Tenhaeff's data was fraudulent.

== See also ==
- Con artist
- Confidence trick
- Fortune telling fraud
- Houdini's debunking of psychics and mediums
- Ann O'Delia Diss Debar
- Televangelist Peter Popoff exposed by James Randi
- Bob Nygaard
