= Port Augusta Prison =

Prison in Stirling North, Australia

- Location in South Australia
- Location: Stirling North, South Australia; 32°30′48″S 137°48′39″E
- Security class: high, medium, low, protectees, special needs
- Capacity: 549 (524 male, 25 female)
- Managed by: Department for Correctional Services

Port Augusta Prison is a prison located in Stirling North just south of Port Augusta, South Australia, Australia.

The prison has facilities for high, medium and low security prisoners including protectees and special needs prisoners. With a capacity of 524 male and 25 female inmates, the prison is one of only two facilities in the State that provides accommodation for female prisoners and has a significant Indigenous Australian population.
