= Mount Gambier Prison =

Prison in Moorak, Australia

Coordinates: 37°51′31″S 140°41′4″E

- Interactive map of Mount Gambier Prison
- Location: Moorak, South Australia
- Security class: Principally medium and low security male sentenced prisoners; can also accommodate short-term high security males and females.
- Capacity: 653
- Opened: 1995
- Managed by: G4S

Mount Gambier Prison is an Australian prison located in Moorak immediately south of Mount Gambier. It is managed and operated by G4S.

== Prison life ==
The prison accommodates medium and low security male sentenced and remand prisoners. Short-term high security male and female prisoners can also be accommodated when required. Accommodation includes: a traditional cell block arrangement, shared living cottages, semi-independent living cottages, an induction area that houses new prisoners, and a small allocation of high-security cells.

Mount Gambier Prison provides a full range of prisoner services, including all medical, education, facilities management, equipment and grounds preventative maintenance services ‘in house’, using locally employed staff and sub-contractors. Consistent with other prisons in South Australia, prisoners are placed on incentive-based regimes that provide varying levels of privileges based on behaviour.

Prisoners are engaged in a range of work programs including grounds and building maintenance, cleaning, laundry and kitchen work. The prison also has a large timber furniture manufacturing workshop that produces bedroom and living room furniture for dispatch directly to retail outlets in South Australia.

Education and program activities focus on numeracy and literacy skills and cognitive skills programs are aimed at high risk offenders. In 1998, prisoners under the instructions of a local builder constructed an education centre within the prison. The work was also attached to a vocational course. This resulted in prisoners learning new skills and obtaining TAFE certificates to assist them upon their release.

A strong partnership exists between Lifeline South East and the prison. This relationship began in mid-1995 with Lifeline's involvement in suicide awareness training for new prison staff. In 2010, the prisoner listener program, which aims to reduce suicides at the prison, gained a national award.

== Improvements ==
In March 2009, an expansion of the prison was announced. With a project budget of $22.9m, it will be the first South Australian prison to employ the cheaper and faster modular construction method using shipping containers. The cell block is constructed as a single storey facility designed around two wings of 54 beds (total of 108 beds) with a central officers station to supervise both wings. Each wing has a central external exercise yard. A new kitchen will also be built and the prison perimeter will be extended.

- During 2003-2004, work was conducted in the cells to eliminate hanging points and the fire safety systems in the cell block, the cottages and the operations building were upgraded.
- In 2005, a new $950,000 state-of-the art Control Room was officially commissioned.
- In 2007, to address pressure on the South Australian Custodial Correctional system, the prisons capacity increased from 110 to 139 beds. In June 2012, the capacity of the prison was 172.
- The 2017 state budget included provision to spend A$38.8 million on adding 160 beds to Mount Gambier Prison.
- By the end of 2018, it could hold 490 inmates.

== Incidents ==
In April 2001, a single prisoner became the first to escape the facility by climbing two razor-wire-topped fences. This is the only escape from within the confines of the prison as of June 2022.

In July 2004, the South Australian Coroner was critical of cell design, Group 4 and Department of Correctional Services staff following the death of a prisoner.

In March 2009, Chief executive of the Department of Correctional Services Peter Severin said that since the Mount Gambier Prison was opened in [1995], it has been a stable facility with "very few" incidents.
