= Disappearance of Joanne Ratcliffe and Kirste Gordon =

Missing Australian girls since 1973

- Ratcliffe (left) and Gordon (right)
- Date: 25 August 1973
- Time: 3:50pm
- Duration: Missing for 53 years, 2 months and 24 days
- Venue: Adelaide Oval
- Location: Adelaide, South Australia
- Type: Abduction
- Missing: Joanne Ratcliffe (11); Kirste Gordon (4)

Locations
1 Adelaide Oval, Australia where Ratcliffe and Gordon disappeared in 1973.
2 Glenelg beach where the Beaumont children disappeared in 1966.

Joanne Ratcliffe (born 1962) and Kirste Jane Gordon (born 1968) were two Australian girls who went missing while attending an Australian rules football match at the Adelaide Oval on 25 August 1973. Their disappearance, and presumed abduction and murder, became one of South Australia's most infamous crimes. The presumed murders are thought by South Australia Police and the media to be related to the disappearance of the Beaumont children in 1966. The case is sometimes referred to as the Adelaide Oval abductions.

== Disappearance ==
Joanne Ratcliffe (born 1962) went to the football game at the Adelaide Oval on 25 August 1973 between Norwood and North Adelaide with her parents Les and Kathleen Ratcliffe, her older brother, and a family friend named "Frank". Kirste Jane Gordon (born 1968) was at the game in the care of her maternal grandmother while her parents, Greg and Christine Gordon, were visiting friends with their younger daughter in Renmark. The two families were seated next to each other in the Sir Edwin Smith Stand.

Ratcliffe's parents and Gordon's grandmother, who were friends, allowed the two girls to go to the toilet together on two occasions that day. The Ratcliffe family rule was that children were not allowed to go to the toilet during the breaks in the game, or during the last quarter. After the girls left at around 3:45 pm, the Ratcliffes began searching from around 4:00. After an unsuccessful first attempt, Kathleen Ratcliffe was finally able to get an announcement made on the oval's PA system shortly after the game ended around 5:00 pm. The girls were reported missing to the police at 5:12 pm.

Police informed Kirste's parents by 9:00pm that their daughter was missing, and they immediately departed Renmark, arriving at Adelaide Oval around midnight to assist with the search.

== Investigation ==
Ratcliffe and Gordon were sighted several times in the 90 minutes after leaving their families. Ken Wohling, the assistant curator of the oval, saw two girls matching their description crouched down trying to attract a stray cat out from under a car. With them was a man wearing a Akubra hat and grey checked sports jacket who told them that he'd help them retrieve the cat.

Anthony Kilmartin, a vendor selling confectionary at the oval, saw the same man with his hat pulled down to his eyeline and carrying Kirste in his left arm. Joanne was kicking and screaming towards him to let Kirste go, after which he angrily told her "You little bitch, go away" and "Bugger off". In the struggle, he dropped his reading glasses, and as he bent down to recover them, he grabbed Joanne's arm and pulled her towards the southern gates. Unaware of the kidnapping, Kilmartin (and other witnesses) assumed the suspect was simply a parent with his children.

The girls disappeared after the last reported sighting on a bridge near the Adelaide Zoo. Another witness, however, later reported seeing them between North Adelaide railway station and Port Road, Thebarton.

On the Sunday morning after the disappearance, Les Ratcliffe accompanied police to Adelaide Oval to retrace Joanne's last known movements. Police divers searched the banks of the nearby Torrens River, whilst other police groups searched the Adelaide Festival Centre, North Adelaide golf course, adjacent railway yards as well as sheds and rubbish bins. Les' employer, Tip Top Bakery in Maylands, took the unprecedented step of instructing all their delivery vans on that Sunday to assist with the search at Adelaide Oval. No trace of the girls was found.

On the evening of the Tuesday following the disappearance, Les Ratcliffe appealed to his daughter's abductor via a live television broadcast, imploring the perpetrator to release the two girls.

Three weeks after the disappearance, police setup two mannequins at Adelaide Oval wearing the same clothes as Joanne and Kirste, in the hope that it would jog someone's memory to come forward with new information about the disappearance. Later, these mannequins were put on display in Rundle Mall, the city's main shopping district.

Despite ongoing police enquires and searches, plus a $5,000 reward which was quickly doubled by the state government for any information about the girls' whereabouts, the abduction quickly became a cold case.

== Later events ==
In 1974, Police revealed that they had received over 4,500 reports from the public, and were still imploring witnesses to come forward for new information. Les Ratcliffe arranged for Joanne's photo to be screened at local drive-ins to keep the case active in the mind's of the Adelaide public.

In 1978, the Ten Network paid for Gerard Croiset Junior, the son of Dutch psychic Gerard Croiset who had assisted in missing persons cases, to come to Australia to aid with investigations. The psychic claimed that the girls were buried in the cellar of an old house in Bowmans, a town north of Adelaide—no trace of the girls was found.

In 1979, Les Ratcliffe stated at a coronial inquest that his daughter had been to Adelaide Oval dozens of times, that she would not have left voluntarily, and that she knew how to use a telephone to call an emergency number. He said she had not met Gordon before that day, and he did not know her parents.

In 1980, Les Ratcliffe was diagnosed with cancer, and died in 1981. Prior to his death, he published an open letter to the public of Adelaide:

"As a parent I could not wish for anyone to live through what I have had to live through... I do not want sympathy. My family does not want sympathy... the illness has caught me just when I was beginning to accept Joanne was gone forever... despite it all, I am happy now..."

In 1990, a spokesperson for the Major Crime Squad revealed that detectives had spoken to a clairvoyant who claimed the bodies of Joanne and Kirste were buried near the Myponga Reservoir, together with the bodies of the three missing Beaumont Childen.

In 2013, on the fortieth anniversary of the case, Ratcliffe's sister Suzie Wilkinson spoke to the media. She expressed her desire that authorities continue to actively work on her sister's case:

"The case has never been officially closed but I would like further investigations into it. I want investigations into more recent developments. I certainly want a little bit more logic put behind why police have dismissed evidence which has been put before them and why things haven't been followed up. We seem to be left in the dark. It might be 40 years to them and just another case, but to us it is 40 years of us not getting to watch Jo grow up. That's 40 years of not having a daughter, a sister, an aunty."

In 2014, a $1 million reward was offered by the South Australian government.

In March 2019, over 45 years after Joanne's disappearance, her mother Kathleen had died. Through her ongoing grief she inspired her daughter Suzie to begin the Leave a light on foundation after she left a porch light on every night after Joanne's disappearance for her to come home.

In March 2025, a private search was conducted near Yatina, about 200 km north of Adelaide. Police said they had searched the area in 2014, and did not believe there was evidence to justify them searching again. A bone fragment was uncovered during the private search, which was sent for forensic analysis, but was later deemed by police to be non-human.

== Suspects ==
A police sketch of the suspect sought for the disappearance of Joanne Ratcliffe and Kirste Gordon.

Many of the suspects in the Beaumont children disappearance are also suspects in this case, including child killer Bevan Spencer von Einem. Witness reports led police to believe that they were abducted by a middle-aged man. Further, the police sketch of the man last seen with the two girls resembles that of the man last seen with the Beaumont children.

=== Arthur Stanley Brown ===
Arthur Stanley Brown (1912–2002) is considered a suspect for both cases, as he bore a striking similarity to an identikit picture of the suspect for both cases. A witness reported seeing a man near the oval carrying a young girl while another older girl in distress followed. The woman first saw him for a single minute when aged 14, and then identified him 25 years later in December 1998 when she saw him on television.

During a 2022 episode of Under Investigation, three images of Brown were compared to the indentikit sketch of the Adelaide Oval abductor using world-leading facial recognition and identification software developed by NEC. Out of a database of 5000 randomly selected images, including three separate images of fellow suspect Stanley Arthur Hart, Brown's images ranked first, third, and fourth, indicating a remarkable resemblance between Brown and the identikit sketch.

=== Stanley Arthur Hart ===
Another possible suspect is Stanley Arthur Hart (25 January 1917 – 30 June 1999). Properties previously owned by Hart (one in Prospect, one at Yatina in the Mid North) were investigated in 2009 and again in 2015. He reportedly rarely missed a North Adelaide match, and a decade after the abduction he was found to be a child abuser. On the 50th anniversary of the abduction in 2023, Ratcliffe's sister, Suzie Wilkinson, claimed that "In my heart of hearts, I believe it was Hart".

In 2025, private investigators uncovered a bone fragment at a property once owned by Stanley Arthur Hart. A forensic anatomist claimed to be 90% certain that the fragment was part of a small human pelvis, and has since been provided to major crime detectives for the purposes of forensic testing. While SA police previously ruled Hart out, they will conduct further investigations if the bone is confirmed human, though this doesn't confirm it belongs to the missing girls. As of February 2026, there has been no further update on the state of the forensic analysis or any further investigation in relation to the matter.

=== "Frank" ===
In 2013, Suzie Wilkinson appealed to the authorities to look into the role that family friend "Frank" may have played in the disappearance of the girls. Frank had accompanied the families to the oval on the day of the girls' abduction, but may not have been formally questioned by police. Frank is alleged to have had intimate knowledge about the girls' routine behaviours during football match outings. Kathleen Ratcliffe said that Frank left his seat for approximately 30 minutes before the girl's disappearance, but later remained seated and did not participate when others formed search parties to look for them. Gordon's grandmother also took notice of Frank's behaviour during the search for the girls saying, "the other man stayed in his seat." It would seem impossible for Frank to be involved as he was only away a short time.

=== Errol George Radan ===
In 2023, convicted Queensland paedophile Errol George Radan (died 2022) was revealed to have been officially investigated as a suspect before his death. Radan repeatedly offended in South Australia until he was imprisoned for the indecent assault of an under-14-year-old girl in 1984. An alleged victim of Radan's abuse claimed that Radan bore striking similarity to the identikit sketch of the abductor, and that he began sexually abusing her around the time of the abduction. After Radan left his Broadview home, it was alleged that both a scrapbook containing clippings of Ratcliffe and Gordon and the clothes of young girls were found in the underground drainage system.

== See also ==
- List of people who disappeared mysteriously: 1910–1990
