= The Family Murders =

Series of murders in South Australia

- Location: Adelaide, South Australia
- Date: 1979 to 1983
- Victims: 5
- Perpetrators: Bevan Spencer von Einem; Others not charged

The Family Murders is the name given to a series of five murders in the state of South Australia, speculated to have been committed by a loosely connected group of individuals who came to be known as "The Family". This group was believed to be involved in the kidnapping and sexual abuse of a number of teenage boys and young men, as well as the torture and murder of five young men aged between 14 and 25, in Adelaide, South Australia, in the 1970s and 1980s. Only one suspect was eventually charged and convicted for one of the crimes: Bevan Spencer von Einem was sentenced in 1984 to a minimum of 24 years (later extended to a minimum 36-year term, and later for the term of his life) for the murder of 15-year-old Richard Kelvin. The other murders remain unsolved; Von Einem died on 5 December 2025 without offering any new information. Rewards remain outstanding for information leading to other convictions for the murders.

== Case ==
Police believe that up to 12 people, several of them high-profile Australians, were involved in the kidnappings. The suspects and their associates were linked mainly by their shared habits of "actively [having] sought out young males for sex," sometimes drugging and raping their victims.Suspect 1, David Richmond, an Eastern Suburbs businessman, is believed to have been with von Einem when Kelvin was abducted. The others are Suspect 2, a former male prostitute and close friend of von Einem known as Mr B. (Robert Bland), and Suspect 3, an Eastern Suburbs doctor, Dr.Stephen George Woodards.

Von Einem was convicted in 1984 of the murder of Kelvin and sentenced to life imprisonment The non-parole period was increased to 36 years after appeal in March 1985. The criminal group became known as "The Family", after a detective described breaking up the "happy family", thought to be responsible for the murders, in a 1988 television interview.

In 1989, von Einem was charged with the murders of two other victims, Barnes and Langley, but the prosecution entered a nolle prosequi (voluntarily discontinue criminal charges) during the trial when crucial similar fact evidence was deemed inadmissible by the presiding judge. Von Einem was also one of the last people seen with a fourth victim, Muir, following his abduction.

Apart from von Einem, three other core members are thought to be directly involved in the murders; while DNA testing re-commenced in 2008, no further charges have been laid.

A cold case review was opened in March 2008 with a $1,000,000 reward available for anyone who provided information leading to a conviction. The reward carried an offer of immunity to accomplices, dependent on their level of involvement. Due to changes in the Forensic Procedures Act, which later allowed DNA samples to be taken from suspects in major indictable offences, all the suspects voluntarily submitted to DNA testing. The ongoing investigation featured in an episode of Crime Stoppers, which went to air on 2 March 2009. The cold case review was completed in November 2010 with no charges being laid against any of the three key suspects.

Some authorities do not recognise the term "The Family", stating that "[t]hey should not be given any title that infers legitimacy. These people have no such bond, only an association that with time probably no longer exists". Others, who have examined the cases, however, argue that there were many more victims. Criminologist Alan Perry, of the University of Adelaide, has argued that the murders were part of a widespread series of kidnappings and sexual assaults of boys that might number several hundred victims in South Australia in the ten years from about 1973 to 1983.

Von Einem died of natural causes in prison aged 79 on 5 December 2025. Rewards ranging from $200,000 to $1 million continue to be offered in each case, for information leading to a conviction.

== Victims ==
Alan Arthur Barnes, aged 16, murdered in 1979. He was last seen while hitchhiking being picked up by a white HQ Holden sedan carrying three or four people on Grand Junction Road. His body had been severely mutilated and dumped in the South Para Reservoir, northeast of Adelaide. A post-mortem examination revealed that Barnes had died of massive blood loss from an anal injury, likely caused by the insertion of a large blunt object. His body also showed signs of beatings and torture. Noctec was found in his blood, suggesting he had been drugged.
Neil Fredrick Muir, aged 25, murdered two months after Barnes in August 1979. His remains had been dissected and neatly cut into many pieces, placed in a garbage bag and thrown into the Port River at Port Adelaide. Skin bearing tattoos had been removed and most of the body parts were placed in another garbage bag before being placed within the abdominal cavity. The head was tied to the torso with rope passed through the mouth and out through the neck. A post-mortem examination revealed that Muir had died of massive blood loss from an anal injury, likely caused by the insertion of a large blunt object and Noctec was found in his blood.
Peter Stogneff, aged 14, murdered in August 1981. His skeletal remains were found later in October 1982 by a local farmer at Middle Beach, 50km north of Adelaide. Stogneff's body had been cut into three pieces in a similar fashion to Muir. Little more could be determined as the remains had been accidentally burnt by the farmer while clearing his property of scrub.
Mark Andrew Langley, aged 18, murdered in February 1982. His mutilated body was found in scrub in the Adelaide foothills nine days after his disappearance. Among the mutilations was a wound that appeared to have been cut with a surgical instrument that went from his navel to the pubic region and part of his small bowel was missing. The hair around the area had been shaved as it would have been in an operation in a hospital. The post-mortem revealed that Langley had died from a massive loss of blood from gross injuries to his anus, similar to Barnes. The sedative-hypnotic drug Mandrax, popular in the 1970s disco scene, was found in Langley's blood.
Richard Dallas Kelvin, aged 15 (born 4 December 1967), murdered in July 1983. A son of popular local Nine Network news presenter Rob Kelvin, he was abducted a short distance from his North Adelaide home on 5 June. His body was found on 24 July by a geologist who was searching for moss-covered rocks near a dirt airstrip at Kersbrook. Kelvin was held captive for approximately five weeks and a post-mortem examination revealed that he had died of massive blood loss from an anal injury, likely caused by the insertion of a large blunt object. Analysis of Kelvin's bloodstream revealed traces of four hypnotic drugs, including Mandrax and Noctec. Trace evidence, including hair and fibres from von Einem's home, was found on Kelvin's body and clothing.

== See also ==
- Disappearance of the Beaumont children
- Disappearance of Joanne Ratcliffe and Kirste Gordon
- List of serial killers by number of victims
- Truro murders
