= Adelaide Remand Centre =

Prison in Adelaide, Australia

- Interactive map of Adelaide Remand Centre
- Location: 208 Currie Street, Adelaide, South Australia; 34°55′28″S 138°35′25″E
- Status: Operational
- Security class: Maximum
- Capacity: 274 (male only)
- Opened: 1986
- Managed by: Serco

The Adelaide Remand Centre is a maximum-security prison facility located in Adelaide, South Australia, used to hold prisoners on remand pending trial. It is located in Currie Street in the Adelaide central business district. As of July 2020 it has a capacity of 274 prisoners in a high-security facility, and is privately managed by Serco.
