= Department for Correctional Services =

South Australian government department

Department overview
- Formed: 1993
- Preceding agencies: Department of Correctional Services (1974-1993); Prisons Department (1965-1974); Sheriff's, Gaols and Prison Department (1936-1965); Gaols and Prisons Department (1867-1936); Sheriff's Department (1867-1936)
- Jurisdiction: South Australia
- Headquarters: 400, King William Street, Adelaide.
- Employees: 2098
- Annual budget: $169.2 million (2022-2023)
- Minister responsible: Joe Szakacs, Minister for Police, Emergency Services and Correctional Services
- Department executive: David Brown, Chief Executive
- Website: Department for Correctional Services

The Department for Correctional Services is the department of the Government of South Australia responsible for adult prisoners, including supervision of offenders and their rehabilitation, in order to protect the public against further crime in the state.

There are nine prisons in the state, including the Adelaide Remand Centre for offenders on remand.
