= Disappearance of the Beaumont children =

1966 disappearance in Australia

- Jane, Grant and Arnna Beaumont, photographed during a 1965 family trip to the Twelve Apostles near Port Campbell, Victoria, Australia
- Date: 26 January 1966
- Duration: Missing for 60 years, 9 months and 26 days
- Location: Glenelg Beach, South Australia, Australia; 34°58′55″S 138°30′58″E
- Theme: Suspected abduction × 3; Suspected murder × 3
- Outcome: Unsolved cold case
- Missing: Jane Beaumont (aged 9 years); Arnna Beaumont (aged 7 years); Grant Beaumont (aged 4 years)

Jane Nartare Beaumont (born 10 September 1956), Arnna Kathleen Beaumont (born 11 November 1958) and Grant Ellis Beaumont (born 12 July 1961), collectively referred to as the Beaumont children, were three Australian siblings who disappeared from Glenelg Beach near Adelaide, South Australia, on 26 January 1966 (Australia Day) in an unsolved disappearance case and a suspected abduction and murder.

Police investigations revealed that, on the day of their disappearance, several witnesses had seen the three children on and near Glenelg Beach in the company of a tall man with fairish to light-brown hair and a thin face with a sun-tanned complexion and medium build, in his mid-thirties. Confirmed sightings of the children occurred at the Colley Reserve and at Wenzel's cake shop on Moseley Street, Glenelg. Despite numerous searches, neither the children nor their suspected companion were located.

The case received worldwide attention and is credited with causing a change in Australian lifestyles, since parents began to believe that their children could no longer be presumed to be safe when unsupervised in public. Police and media speculation has linked the disappearances to the "Adelaide Oval abductions" of Joanne Ratcliffe and Kirste Gordon in 1973. Interest in the case has continued for more than half a century. As of 2018, a A$1 million reward has been offered for information related to the cold case by the South Australian government.

== Background ==
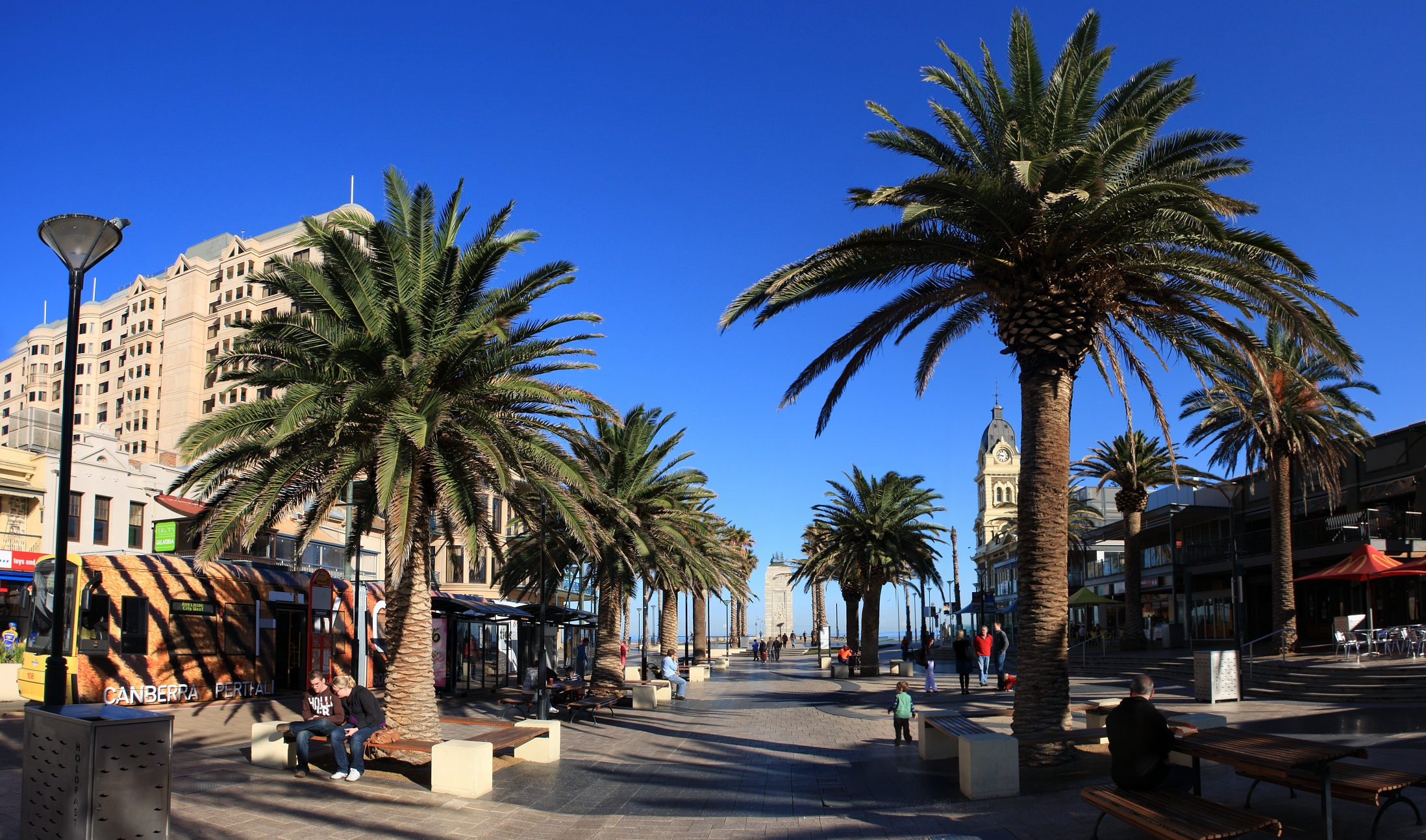
The beachside suburb of Glenelg where the Beaumont children were last seen

Jane, Arnna and Grant Beaumont lived with their parents, Grant "Jim" Beaumont, a former serviceman and taxi driver, and Nancy Beaumont (née Ellis); the couple had married in December 1955. The family resided at 109 Harding Street in Somerton Park, South Australia, a suburb of Adelaide. They lived not far from Glenelg Beach, a popular spot that the children often visited. On 25 January 1966, in the midst of a summer heatwave, Jim dropped the children off at Glenelg Beach before heading off on a three-day sales trip to Snowtown.

On the morning of 26 January (Australia Day), the children asked their mother if they could visit Glenelg Beach again. As it was too hot to walk, they took a five-minute, 3-kilometre (1.9 mi) bus journey from their home to the beach. They caught the bus at 8:45 in the morning, and were expected to return home on the 12:00 noon bus. Nancy became worried, however, when they did not return on either the 12:00 or 14:00 buses, and when Jim returned home early from his trip around 15:00, he immediately drove to the crowded beach. Unable to locate the children, he returned and together both parents searched the streets and visited friends' houses. Around 17:30, they went to Glenelg police station to report the disappearance.

== Police investigation ==
Movements of the Beaumont children on 26 January 1966

Police quickly organised a search of Glenelg Beach and adjacent areas, based on the assumption that the Beaumont children were nearby and had simply lost track of time. Police and volunteers scoured beaches, dunes, drains and suburbs across Adelaide. The search then expanded to the sandhills, ocean and nearby buildings, with the airport, rail lines and interstate roads being monitored as well, based on a fear of accident or kidnap. Within twenty-four hours, the entire nation was aware of the case.

Police also searched for some of the 17 items in the children's possession at the time of their disappearance, including clothing, towels and a bag. Despite ongoing searches, no trace of these items or the children were found.

Within three days, on 29 January, the Adelaide Sunday Mail led with a headline of "Sex crime now feared", highlighting the rapidly evolving fear that the children had been abducted and murdered by a sex offender. Despite this, the initial official reward was only A£250.

The Patawalonga Boat Haven was drained on 29 January after a woman told police that she had spoken with three children, who were similar in description to the Beaumont children, near the haven at 19:00 on the day of the disappearance. Police cadets and members of the emergency operations group searched the area, but nothing was found.

=== Prime suspect ===
A police sketch of the suspect sought for the Beaumont children disappearance.

Police investigating the case found several witnesses who had seen the Beaumont children in Colley Reserve, near Glenelg Beach, in the company of a tall man with fair to light-brown hair and a thin face, in his mid-thirties. The man had a sun-tanned complexion and a thin-to-athletic build, and was wearing swim trunks. The children were playing with him, and appeared to be relaxed and enjoying themselves. The man also approached one of the witnesses, asking if anyone had been near the children's belongings as their money was "missing". The man then went off to change while the children waited for him. The group were then seen walking away together from the beach sometime later, which the police estimated to be around 12:15. About two-and-a-half hours later (14:45) another witness, Miss Daphne Gregory, sighted the children with the man, whom she observed carrying an airline bag similar to one owned by Jane.

The Beaumont parents described their children, particularly the eldest (Jane) as shy. For them to be playing so confidently with a stranger seemed out of character. Investigators theorised that the children had perhaps met the man during a previous visit or visits and had grown to trust him. A chance remark at home, which seemed insignificant at the time, supports this theory: Arnna had told her mother that Jane had "got a boyfriend down the beach". Nancy thought she meant a playmate and took no further notice until after the disappearance.

A shopkeeper at nearby Wenzel's Bakery, on Moseley Street, reported that Jane had bought pasties and a meat pie with a £1 note. Police viewed this as further evidence that the Beaumont children had been with another person, for two reasons: the shopkeeper knew the children well from previous visits and reported that they had never purchased a meat pie before, and the children's mother had given them only six shillings and six pence, enough for their bus fare and lunch, and not £1. Police believed the money had been given to them by somebody else.

=== Other sightings ===
According to an initial statement, the Beaumont children were seen walking alone at 14:55, away from the beach along Jetty Road, in the general direction of their home. The witness, a postman, knew the children well, and his statement was regarded as reliable. He said the children were "holding hands and laughing" in the main street. Police could not determine why the reliable children, already one hour late, were strolling alone and seemingly unconcerned. The postman contacted police two days after his initial statement and said that he thought he saw them in the morning, not the afternoon as he had previously said.

Other reported sightings of the children continued for about a year after their disappearance.

=== Gerard Croiset ===
The Beaumont case attracted international attention. On 8 November 1966, Gerard Croiset, a Dutch psychic, was brought to Australia to assist in the search, which caused a furore in the press. Croiset's efforts proved unsuccessful, with his story changing day-to-day and offering no clues. He identified a spot at a warehouse near the children's home in which he believed their bodies had been buried, inside the remains of an old brick kiln. The property owners, who were reluctant to excavate based only on a psychic's claim, soon bowed to public pressure after publicity helped raise A$40,000 to have the building demolished. No remains, nor any evidence tied to any members of the Beaumont family, was found. In 1996, the building identified by Croiset was undergoing partial demolition and the owners allowed a full search of the site. Once again, no trace was found of the children.

=== Hoax letters ===
About two years after the disappearance, the Beaumont parents received two letters: one was supposedly written by Jane, and another by a man who said he was keeping the children. The envelopes showed a postmark of Dandenong, Victoria. The brief notes described a relatively pleasant existence and referred to "The Man" who was keeping them. Police believed at the time that the letters could quite likely have been authentic after comparing them with others written by Jane. The letter from "The Man" said that he had appointed himself "guardian" of the children and was willing to hand them back to their parents. In the letter a meeting place was nominated.

The Beaumont parents, followed by a detective, drove to the designated place but nobody appeared. Some time later a third letter arrived, also purported to be from Jane, stating that the man had realised a disguised detective was present and that he decided to keep the children because the Beaumonts had betrayed his trust. There were no further letters. In 1992, new forensic examinations of the letters showed they were a hoax. Fingerprint technology had improved and the author was identified as a 41-year-old man who had been a teenager at the time he wrote the letters. Because of the time that had elapsed, he was not charged with any offence.

== Possible suspects ==
=== Bevan Spencer von Einem ===
Bevan Spencer von Einem (1946–2025) was sentenced to life imprisonment in 1984 for murdering Richard Kelvin, the teenage son of Adelaide newsreader Rob Kelvin. Police and prosecutors publicly stated their belief that von Einem had accomplices and was possibly involved in additional murders. About this time, police came to suspect his involvement in the Beaumont disappearance as well, owing to his resemblance to descriptions and identikits of the unidentified suspect from 1966. No accomplices were ever charged, and von Einem has refused to co-operate with investigators about his possible connection with other murders.

During the investigation into von Einem, police heard from an informant identified only as "Mr B." He related an alleged conversation in which von Einem boasted of having taken three children from a beach several years earlier, and said he had taken them home to conduct "experiments". According to Mr B's account, von Einem claimed to have performed "brilliant surgery" on each of the children and had "connected them up". One of the children had supposedly died during the procedure, and so he had killed the other two and dumped the bodies in bushland south of Adelaide. Mr B also claimed that von Einem had implicated himself in the Adelaide Oval abductions from 1973; like with the Beaumont case, von Einem matches descriptions of the main suspect in the Oval case.

According to Adelaide police detective Bob O'Brien, Mr B had given important information during the investigation into the Kelvin murder and was regarded as a generally reliable source. However, police reception of the alleged confession was mixed. There were enough plausible details to warrant further research, yet other details relayed by Mr B did not fit known facts about the Beaumont case and were regarded with scepticism. As of 2014, von Einem had not been ruled out as a suspect.

Mr B's reference to alleged surgical experimentation corresponded to the coroner's reports on several of von Einem's alleged murder victims. However, while von Einem was known to have frequented Glenelg Beach to "perv" on the changing rooms, and was described as preoccupied with children, he was younger than the unidentified suspect (who was reported to be in his mid- to late thirties, whereas von Einem was in his early twenties). The Beaumont children were also much younger than Richard Kelvin or the other young men von Einem is believed to have targeted, who were in their teens or twenties. Such disparities in the modus operandi of a serial killer are unusual, but not unheard of.

Investigations into both the Beaumont disappearance and the Adelaide Oval abductions remain officially open and, in 1989, von Einem was identified as a suspect in a confidential police report. In August 2007, it was reported that police were examining archival footage from the original Beaumont search, shot by Channel Seven, that shows a young man resembling von Einem among onlookers. The report said that police were calling for information to establish the man's identity.

=== Arthur Stanley Brown ===
Arthur Stanley Brown (1912–2002) was charged in 1998 with the murders of sisters Judith and Susan Mackay in Townsville, Queensland. The sisters had disappeared on their way to school on 26 August 1970 and were found strangled several days later in a dry creek bed. Brown's trial, scheduled for July 2000, was delayed after his lawyer applied for a section 613 verdict (unfit to be tried) from the jury. Brown was never retried as he was found to have dementia and Alzheimer's disease. He died in 2002.

Similar to von Einem, Brown bore a striking similarity to descriptions and identikits of the suspect for both the Beaumont and Oval cases. A search for a connection to the Beaumont children was unsuccessful as no employment records existed that could shed light on Brown's movements at the time of the disappearance. Some of the records were believed lost in the 1974 Brisbane flood. It is also possible that Brown, who had unrestricted access to government buildings, may have destroyed his own files.

Although there is no proof that he had ever visited Adelaide, a witness recalled having a conversation with Brown in which he mentioned having seen the Adelaide Festival Centre nearing completion, which would place him in the city shortly before the Oval abduction on 25 August 1973. However, no evidence has ever been found to connect Brown with Adelaide in 1966. Brown was aged 53 at the time of the Beaumont disappearance, which does not match the description of the suspect seen with the children, who was reported as being in his thirties.

=== James Ryan O'Neill ===
James O'Neill (born 1947), who was sentenced to life imprisonment for the 1975 murder of a nine-year-old boy in Tasmania, is reported to have previously told several acquaintances that he was responsible for the Beaumont disappearance. In 2006, O'Neill lost an injunction in the High Court of Australia to stop the broadcast of an ABC documentary, The Fishermen, which attempted to link him to the case.

Former Victorian detective Gordon Davie spent three years speaking to O'Neill to win his confidence before filming him for The Fishermen. Davie said that although there was no evidence to link O'Neill to the Beaumont case, he was persuaded that O'Neill was to blame. "I asked him about the Beaumonts and he said: 'I couldn't have done it. I was in Melbourne at that time.' That is not a denial." Later asked again if he had murdered the children, O'Neill replied, "Look, on legal advice I am not going to say where I was or when I was there." Although O'Neill claims never to have visited Adelaide, his work in the opal industry at the time required that he frequently visit Coober Pedy, which would have required him to pass through the city. Davie also suspected O'Neill was involved in the Adelaide Oval disappearances. The South Australia Police have interviewed O'Neill and discounted him as a suspect in the Beaumont case.

=== Derek Ernest Percy ===
Derek Percy (1948–2013), a convicted child murderer and Victoria's then-longest-serving prisoner, was suggested in a 2007 article in Melbourne's The Age newspaper as a suspect in the Beaumont case. The Age alleged that evidence gathered by cold case investigators pointed to Percy in a number of unsolved child murders, including the Beaumont case. His insanity plea in the 1969 murder of Yvonne Tuohy was at least partly based on his suffering a psychological condition that could prevent him remembering details of his actions. Percy was supposed to have indicated that he believed he might have killed the Beaumont children, as he was in the area at the time, but he had no recollection of actually doing so. On 30 August 2007, Victoria Police successfully applied for permission to question Percy in relation to the Beaumont case.

In 1966, Percy was aged 17 and therefore seems too young to have been the unidentified suspect seen with the children. It is also unknown whether Percy would have had access to a car at that time, while the unidentified suspect is presumed by commentators to have had access to one for facilitating a quick getaway and also for disposing of the children's bodies later. Percy was imprisoned from 1969 until his death in 2013, which means that he could not have been the suspect in the Adelaide Oval abductions, whom many investigators believe to be connected to the Beaumont case.

=== Alan Anthony Munro ===
Alan Maxwell McIntyre (died in 2017)—who had himself been investigated by police and cleared of involvement in the Beaumont case—gave a secondhand account to the Adelaide Advertiser that a man he had known in 1966, who by 2015 was being sought in Southeast Asia in connection with child abuse incidents there, had come to his home with the children's bodies in the boot of his car. McIntyre's children said that they and their father initially mistook Arnna's body for that of a boy because of her short haircut.

The man in question was later identified as businessman Alan Anthony Munro (aged 75 in 2017), a former scoutmaster who had pleaded guilty to ten child sex offences dating back to 1962. For these crimes, Munro was sentenced to ten years' imprisonment, with a non-parole period of five years and five months, making him eligible for release in 2022.

In June 2017, Adelaide police detectives were given a copy of a child's diary, written in 1966, which allegedly placed Munro in the vicinity of Glenelg Beach at the time of the Beaumont disappearance. He was convicted of abusing several children, including one of McIntyre's sons, who was a contributor to the diary. Munro had been previously investigated by police, but no evidence had been found that he was involved in the Beaumont case.

=== Harry Phipps ===
Harry Phipps (1917–2004), a local factory owner and then-member of Adelaide's social elite, came to attention as a possible suspect after the publication of the book The Satin Man: Uncovering the Mystery of the Missing Beaumont Children in 2013. The book did not name the identity of the Satin Man, but Phipps' estranged son, Haydn, named him soon after the book's publication.

Phipps bore a substantial likeness to the identikit of the man seen talking to the Beaumont children at Glenelg Beach. He was wealthy and known to be in the habit of giving out £1 notes, was later alleged to have been a paedophile and lived only 300 metres away from the beach on the corner of Augusta Street and Sussex Street. Haydn, who was aged 15 at the time of the disappearance, came forward to researchers in 2007 with the claim that he had seen the children in his father's yard on 26 January. Two other persons, youths at the time, said that they had been paid by Phipps to dig a 2 × 1 × 2-metre hole in his factory yard that weekend, for unstated reasons.

==== North Plympton excavations ====
In November 2013, a one-metre-squared section of a factory in North Plympton, which had been owned by Phipps, was excavated. A ground-penetrating radar found "one small anomaly, which can indicate movement or objects within the soil", but the dig found no additional evidence and investigations into the site were closed.

On 22 January 2018, Adelaide detectives announced that they would return to the factory site and conduct further excavations, after a private investigation sponsored by Channel Seven in Adelaide. The excavation, on 2 February 2018, took nine hours. Animal bones and general rubbish were found, but nothing related to the Beaumont case.

In February 2025, based on new evidence, South Australian MP Frank Pangallo organised a third, privately funded, excavation at the site. The week-long search did not find any remains of the children.

== Legacy ==
The Beaumont case resulted in one of the largest police investigations in Australian history and remains one of Australia's most infamous cold cases, even after many decades. In January 2018, the Premier of South Australia, Jay Weatherill, said that South Australia Police had "never given up on the case" and that they "have a policy that no murder investigation ends up in a closed file". The State Government also continues to maintain a A$1 million reward for information relating to the children's disappearance.

The kidnapping is also viewed by many social commentators as a significant event in the evolution of Australian society, with a large number of people changing the way they supervised their children daily. At the time, it was never publicly suggested that the children should not have been allowed to travel unsupervised, or that their parents were in any way negligent, simply because contemporary Australian society took it for granted that this was safe and acceptable. However, this case, alongside similar child-related crimes such as the 1960 Graeme Thorne kidnapping and the 1965 Wanda Beach murders, "marked an end of innocence in [post-war] Australian life".

The regular and widespread attention given to this case, its significance in Australian criminal history, and the fact that the mystery of their disappearance has never been explained, have led to the story being continually revisited by the media. New leads and clues are regularly reported by the media, and the case still regularly headlines print and broadcast media more than half a century on.

=== Parents ===
At the time of the investigation, the Beaumont parents received widespread sympathy from the Australian public. They remained at their Somerton Park home; Nancy in particular held hope that the children would return, and stated in interviews that it would be "dreadful" if the children returned home and did not find their parents waiting for them. Over the years, as new leads and new theories emerged, the Beaumonts co-operated fully in exploring every possibility, whether it was claims that the children had been abducted by a religious cult and were living variously in New Zealand, Melbourne, or Tasmania, or some clue that suggested a possible burial site for the children. They were devastated in 1990 when newspapers published computer-generated photographs of how the children might have looked as adults. The pictures, published against their wishes, caused a huge wave of public sympathy from a community which was still sensitive to their pain.

The couple later divorced and lived separately, having resolved to live their final years away from the public attention that followed them for decades. They sold their Somerton Park home and the South Australian Police remained informed of the couple's new addresses, as the case remains open. The Beaumonts were reported to have accepted that the truth of their children's disappearances may never be discovered. Nancy died in an Adelaide nursing home on 16 September 2019, aged 92. Grant died, also in Adelaide, on 9 April 2023, aged 97.

== Media ==
The case attracted widespread police and media attention in Australia and beyond. The fact that the case has never been explained has led to the story being continually revisited by the media, and by newer online sites, more than sixty years after the children's disappearance. Some examples include:

- "The Wanda Beach Murders/The Beaumont Children Mystery". Crime Investigation Australia. Series 1. Episode 11. 2007. Crime & Investigation Network.
- Whiticker, Alan (2006). Searching for the Beaumont Children: Australia's Most Famous Unsolved Mystery. John Wiley & Sons Australia. ISBN 978-1-74031-106-9.
- Whiticker, Alan; Mullins, Stuart (2013). The Satin Man: Uncovering the Mystery of the Missing Beaumont Children. New Holland Publishers. ISBN 978-1-74257-308-3.
- Madigan, Michael (2015). The missing Beaumont children: 50 years of mystery and misery. Griffin Press. ISBN 978-0-9756746-7-3.
- "The Beaumont Children: What Really Happened". Seven News Investigates. January 2018. Seven Network.
- "The Beaumont Children". Casefile True Crime Podcast. Episode 100. November 2018.

== See also ==
- List of people who disappeared mysteriously (1910–1970)
