= List of Casefile True Crime Podcast episodes =

This is a list of Casefile episodes. Casefile is a weekly (sometimes fortnightly) Australian crime podcast that first aired in January 2016 and hosted by an Australian man who wishes to remain anonymous. The series deals with solved or cold criminal cases, often related to well-known murders and serial crimes. The release dates listed below are based on the official website. This list also includes the series' companion podcast, From the Files, aired since July 2019 but placed on hiatus in 2020.

Note that not all episodes are currently available, however, as cases 13, 19, and 30 were initially published but later removed with the intention of updating and rewriting them. Case 55 (Simone Strobel, released 15 July 2017), was removed due to legal issues, although general details of the podcast itself are still publicly available.

== Episodes ==
=== 2016 ===
| Case | Title | Date | Notes |
|---|---|---|---|
| 01 | The Wanda Beach Murders | 9 January | |
| 02 | The Somerton Man | 16 January | |
| 03 | Lauria Bible & Ashley Freeman | 23 January | Update–24 April 2018 |
| 04 | Who Put Bella In The ‘Witch’ Elm | 30 January | |
| 05 | Donna Wheeler | 6 February | |
| 06 | Roger Dean | 13 February | |
| 07 | Julian Buchwald & Carolynne Watson | 20 February | |
| 08 | Holly Wells & Jessica Chapman | 27 February | |
| 09 | Jonathan Luna | 5 March | |
| 10 | Peter Shellard | 12 March | |
| 11 | Anneliese Michel | 19 March | |
| 12 | Katherine Knight | 26 March | |
| 13 | The Family Court Murders | 2 April | Currently unavailable |
| 14 | Helen Munnings | 9 April | |
| 15 | The Weepy Voiced Killer | 16 April | |
| 16 | Chris & Cru Kahui | 23 April | |
| 17 | The Eriksson Twins | 30 April | |
| 18 | The North Hollywood Shootout | 7 May | |
| 19 | Snowtown | 14 May | Currently unavailable |
| 20 | Stoni Blair & Stephen Berry | 21 May | |
| 21 | Pamela Lawrence | 28 May | |
| 22 | Marguerite Edwards | 11 June | |
| 23 | The Frankston Serial Killer | 18 June | Part 2–25 June |
| 24 | Russell Street Bombing | 2 July | Part 2–9 July |
| 25 | Prue Bird | 16 July | |
| 26 | Lisa Marie Young | 23 July | Update–23 December |
| 27 | The West Mesa Bone Collector | 30 July | |
| 28 | Lindsay Buziak | 6 August | Update–24 August; 27 January 2019 |
| 29 | The Burgate House Murders | 13 August | |
| 30 | The Claremont Serial Killer | 20 August | Update–23 December; Currently unavailable |
| 31 | The Killer Couple | 27 August | |
| 32 | Grace & Kathleen Holmes | 4 September | |
| 33 | Jaycee Lee Dugard | 17 September | |
| 34 | The Catholic Mafia | 24 September | |
| 35 | Operation Mayan | 8 October | |
| 36 | Amok | 15 October | |
| 37 | The Yorkshire Ripper | 22 October | Part 2–29 October; Part 3–5 November |
| 38 | The Pikuls | 12 November | |
| 39 | Janelle Patton | 3 December | |
| 40 | John Newman | 10 December | |

=== 2017 ===
| Case | Title | Date | Notes |
|---|---|---|---|
| 41 | Mr Cruel | 7 January | Revisited 17 October 2026 |
| 42 | Sherri Rasmussen | 14 January | |
| 43 | Keith Warren | 21 January | |
| 44 | Peter Falconio | 28 January | |
| 45 | Port Arthur | 11 February | |
| 46 | The Frankston and Tynong North Serial Killer | 18 February | Update–22 October |
| 47 | Yara Gambirasio | 25 February | |
| 48 | Suzy Lamplugh | 4 March | |
| 49 | The Moors Murders | 18 March | Part 2–25 March; Part 3–1 April |
| 50 | Jennifer Pan | 15 April | |
| 51 | Tina Watson | 22 April | |
| 52 | Mary & Beth Stauffer, Jason Wilkman | 6 May | |
| 53 | The East Area Rapist | 13 May | Part 2–20 May; Part 3–27 May; Part 4–3 June; Part 5–4 June; Bonus Interviews–15 June; Update–25 April 2018; Part 6–5 December 2020 |
| 54 | Daniel Morcombe | 1 July | |
| 55 | Simone Strobel | 15 July | Removed for legal reasons. Archived on the Internet Archive. |
| 56 | Anita Cobby | 22 July | |
| 57 | Walsh Street | 29 July | |
| 58 | Shannon Matthews | 12 August | |
| 59 | Amy Lynn Bradley | 18 August | |
| 60 | Jonestown | 16 September | Part 2–16 September; Part 3–23 September |
| 61 | The Lin Family | 30 September | |
| 62 | The Honolulu Strangler | 7 October | |
| 63 | Catherine Holmes & Georgina Watmore | 14 October | |
| 64 | Peter Weinberger | 28 October | |
| 65 | Allison Baden-Clay | 4 November | |
| 66 | The Black Widow | 11 November | |
| 67 | The Battle of Alcatraz | 18 November | |
| 68 | Escape from Alcatraz | 25 November | |
| 69 | Gary Patterson | 2 December | |
| 70 | The Kimberley Killer | 9 December | |
| 71 | Elodie Morel | 16 December | |

=== 2018 ===
| Case | Title | Date | Notes |
|---|---|---|---|
| 72 | Wilhelmina Kruger & Anna Dowlingkoa | 13 January | |
| 73 | The Lady in the Barrel | 17 January | |
| 74 | Eric Coy | 20 January | |
| 75 | Graeme Thorne | 27 January | |
| 76 | Silk Road | 10 February | Part 2–17 February; Part 3–24 February |
| 77 | Mia Zapata | 11 March | |
| 78 | The Janabi Family | 17 March | Bonus Interview - 1 February 2020 |
| 79 | Rayna Rison | 25 March | |
| 80 | Beth Barnard | 8 April | Bonus Interview–11 April |
| 81 | Brian Wells | 15 April | |
| 82 | Maria Korp | 22 April | |
| 83 | Chantelle & Leela McDougall, Tony Popic | 6 May | |
| 84 | Lesley Molseed | 12 May | Part 2–19 May |
| 85 | Tom Brown | 3 June | |
| 86 | Amy Allwine | 9 June | |
| 87 | Elaine O'Hara | 16 June | |
| 88 | Stephen Hilder | 7 July | |
| 89 | Ella Tundra | 14 July | |
| 90 | Hoddle Street | 28 July | |
| 91 | Carly Ryan | 4 August | |
| 92 | Dnepropetrovsk Maniacs | 11 August | |
| 93 | Susan Snow & Bruce Nickell | 25 August | |
| 94 | Millie & Trevor Horn, Janice Saunders | 1 September | |
| 95 | The Vampire of Krakow | 8 September | |
| 96 | The Toy Box | 22 September | Part 2–29 September; Part 3–6 October |
| 97 | Rebecca Schaeffer | 20 October | |
| 98 | The Pillow Pyro | 27 October | |
| 99 | Becky Watts | 10 November | |
| 100 | The Beaumont Children | 17 November | |
| 101 | Sian Kingi | 24 November | |
| 102 | Britt Lapthorne | 1 December | |
| 103 | The Gonzales Family | 15 December | |
| 104 | Mark & John | 22 December | |
| - | Q&A with Anonymous Host | 29 December | bonus episode |

=== 2019 ===
| Case | Title | Date | Notes |
|---|---|---|---|
| 105 | Louise Bell | 26 January | |
| 106 | Peter Nielsen | 2 February | Part 2–9 February |
| 107 | Lucie Blackman & Carita Ridgway | 23 February | |
| 108 | The Kicevo Monster | 2 March | |
| 109 | Belanglo | 23 March | Part 2–30 March; Part 3–6 April; Part 4–13 April; Part 5–20 April |
| 110 | Muriel McKay | 4 May | |
| 111 | Shauna Howe | 18 May | |
| 112 | Rachel Barber | 25 May | |
| 113 | Brendan Bernard | 1 June | |
| 114 | Elisa Claps & Heather Barnett | 15 June | |
| 115 | Operation Cathedral | 22 June | |
| 116 | Chloe Ayling | 29 June | |
| 117 | Hannah Foster | 13 July | |
| 118 | The Chicago Tylenol Murders | 21 July | |
| 119 | Abigail Williams & Liberty German | 27 July | |
| 120 | Bill McGuire | 10 August | |
| 121 | The Freeway Phantom | 17 August | |
| 122 | Leeann Lapham | 24 August | |
| 123 | Mark Kilroy | 7 September | |
| 124 | Hinterkaifeck | 14 September | |
| 125 | The Angels of Wynarka & Belanglo | 21 September | |
| 126 | Johnny Altinger | 5 October | |
| 127 | Killer Petey | 12 October | |
| 128 | Joan Vollmer | 19 October | |
| 129 | The Dupont De Ligonnès Family | 2 November | |
| 130 | Joe Cinque | 9 November | |
| 131 | Mr Stinky | 16 November | |
| 132 | Rui Pedro Teixeira Mendonça | 30 November | |
| 133 | Tom & Eileen Lonergan | 7 December | |
| 134 | Martha Puebla | 14 December | |
| 135 | The Santa Claus Bank Robbery | 21 December | |

=== 2020 ===
| Case | Title | Date | Notes |
|---|---|---|---|
| 136 | Azaria Chamberlain | 15 February | |
| 137 | Arlis Perry | 22 February | |
| 138 | The Batavia | 29 February | |
| 139 | Beryl & Geraldine Evans | 13 March | Part 2–20 March |
| 140 | Richmond Hill | 27 March | |
| 141 | Natalee Holloway | 11 April | |
| 142 | The Churchill Fire | 18 April | |
| 143 | Leigh Leigh | 25 April | |
| 144 | The Muswell Hill Murderer | 9 May | Part 2–16 May; Part 3–23 May |
| 145 | Michael Dippolito | 6 June | |
| 146 | Brittany Phillips | 13 June | |
| 147 | Julie Dart & Stephanie Slater | 20 June | |
| 148 | The Miyazawa Family | 4 July | |
| 149 | Anan Liu | 11 July | |
| 150 | The Murchison Murders | 18 July | |
| 151 | Dan O’Connell & James Ellison | 1 August | |
| 152 | Cindy and Mona Lisa Smith | 8 August | |
| 153 | Anni Hindocha | 15 August | |
| 154 | Steven Stayner | 29 August | |
| 155 | Danniella Vian | 6 September | |
| 156 | Shergar | 12 September | |
| 157 | The Strip Search Scam | 26 September | |
| 158 | Russell Martin | 3 October | |
| 159 | James Craig Anderson | 10 October | |
| 160 | Beverly McGowan | 24 October | |
| 161 | The Yosemite Sightseer Murders | 31 October | Part 2–7 November |
| 162 | Lawrence Haggart | 21 November | |
| 163 | Joanne Ratcliffe & Kirste Gordon | 28 November | |

=== 2021 ===
| Case | Title | Date | Notes |
|---|---|---|---|
| 164 | Cindy James | 6 February | |
| 165 | Nicholas Barclay | 13 February | |
| 166 | The Family | 20 February | |
| 167 | Jai, Tyler & Bailey Farquharson | 6 March | |
| 168 | Guðmundur & Geirfinnur Einarsson | 13 March | |
| 169 | Corinna Mullen | 20 March | |
| 170 | The Caffey Family | 27 March | |
| 171 | The Gladbeck Hostage Crisis | 10 April | |
| 172 | Michael Gregsten & Valerie Storie | 17 April | |
| 173 | Rocio Wanninkhof & Sonia Carabantes | 24 April | |
| 174 | Vicki Arnold & Julie-Anne Leahy | 8 May | |
| 175 | Gail & Rick Brink | 15 May | |
| 176 | Yingying Zhang | 22 May | |
| 177 | 657 Boulevard | 29 May | Originally a Patreon Picks episode |
| 178 | The Woman Without a Face | 5 June | |
| 179 | Christie Marceau | 12 June | |
| 180 | Bill Payne & Billie-Jean Hayworth | 19 June | |
| 181 | The Vampire of Nuremberg | 26 June | Originally a Patreon Picks episode |
| 182 | Freda Burnell & Florence Little | 31 July | |
| 183 | The MacKenzie Family | 7 August | |
| 184 | Gay Gibson | 14 August | |
| 185 | Kim Chol | 21 August | Originally a Patreon Picks episode |
| 186 | The Bowraville Murders | 28 August | |
| 187 | Peter & Joan Porco | 4 September | |
| 188 | Robert Wone | 11 September | |
| 189 | JoAnne Chambers | 18 September | Originally a Patreon Picks episode |
| 190 | The Butcher Baker | 25 September | Part 2–2 October |
| 191 | Sheree Beasley | 9 October | |
| 192 | The Sodder Children | 16 October | Originally a Patreon Picks episode |
| 193 | Suesan Knorr & Sheila Sanders | 23 October | |
| 194 | Lake Bodom | 30 October | |
| 195 | The Costa Mesa Murders | 6 November | |
| 196 | Boy A | 13 November | Originally a Patreon Picks episode |
| 197 | The Austrian Ripper | 20 November | |
| 198 | Tami Reay | 27 November | |
| 199 | Truro | 4 December | |

=== 2022 ===
| Case | Title | Date | Notes |
|---|---|---|---|
| 200 | The Zodiac | 5 February | Part 2–12 February; Part 3–19 February; Part 4–26 February |
| 201 | Janet Chandler | 4 March | |
| 202 | Moira Anderson | 12 March | |
| 203 | Bob Chappell | 19 March | |
| 204 | The Glendale Train Crash | 26 March | Originally a Patreon Picks episode |
| 205 | Bernd Brandes | 4 April | |
| 206 | Julio & Candra Torres | 9 April | |
| 207 | Suzanne Amstrong & Susan Bartlett | 16 April | |
| 208 | John Chau | 23 April | Originally a Patreon Picks episode |
| 209 | Urban Höglin & Heidi Paakkonen | 30 April | |
| 210 | Jayna Murray | 7 May | |
| 211 | Cari Farver | 14 May | |
| 212 | The Forgotten Cannibal | 21 May | Originally a Patreon Picks episode |
| 213 | The Noordhoek "Ripper Rapists" | 28 May | |
| 214 | Kevin Hjalmarsson | 4 June | |
| 215 | The One-Man Crime Wave | 11 June | |
| 216 | The Itzkovitz Family | 25 June | Originally a Patreon Picks episode |
| 217 | Kathleen Marshall | 2 July | |
| 218 | The Blackout Killers | 9 July | Part 2–16 July |
| 219 | Doctor John | 20 August | Originally a Patreon Picks episode |
| 220 | Hannah Witheridge & David Miller | 27 August | |
| 221 | Frank & Carol Hilley | 3 September | |
| 222 | Karina Holmer | 10 September | Originally a Patreon Picks episode |
| 223 | The Kuřim Case | 17 September | |
| 224 | Evelyn Hartley | 24 September | |
| 225 | Raheel Siddiqui | 1 October | |
| 226 | El Mataviejitas | 8 October | Originally a Patreon Picks episode |
| 227 | Mike Williams | 15 October | |
| 228 | The Harrison Family | 22 October | |
| 229 | The Killer Realtor | 29 October | |
| 230 | Rubí Frayre & Marisela Escobedo | 5 November | Originally a Patreon Picks episode |
| 231 | Anna-Jane Cheney | 12 November | |
| 232 | Jo, Michelle & Christe Rogers | 19 November | |
| 233 | Denise Amber Lee | 26 November | |
| 234 | Franca Viola | 3 December | Originally a Patreon Picks episode |

=== 2023 ===
| Case | Title | Date | Notes |
|---|---|---|---|
| 235 | House of Horrors | 4 February | Part 2–11 February; Part 3–18 February |
| 236 | Sophie Lionnet | 25 February | Originally a Patreon Picks episode |
| 237 | Rena & Danny Paquette | 4 March | |
| 238 | Renae Marsden | 5 March | |
| 239 | Peggy Carr | 18 March | |
| 240 | JasonInHell | 25 March | Originally a Patreon Picks episode |
| 241 | Harry & Nicola Fuller | 31 March | |
| 242 | The Investor Murders | 8 April | |
| 243 | Deidre Kennedy | 15 April | |
| 244 | Engla Höglund & Pernilla Hellgren | 22 April | Originally a Patreon Picks episode |
| 245 | Sherri Papini | 29 April | |
| 246 | Grégory Villemin | 6 May | Part 2–13 May |
| 247 | Nina Puganova, Irina Trasyn & Anastasia Mikhailova | 20 May | Originally a Patreon Picks episode |
| 248 | Abraham Shakespeare | 27 May | |
| 249 | Lorraine Wilson & Wendy Adams | 3 June | |
| 250 | Amy Boyer | 8 June | |
| 251 | The Caldwell Farmhouse Murders | 17 June | Originally a Patreon Picks episode |
| 252 | Margaret Maher, Mersina Halvagis & Nicole Patterson | 24 June | |
| 253 | Aarushi Talwar & Hemraj Banjade | 1 July | |
| 254 | Winsie Hau | 8 July | Originally a Patreon Picks episode |
| 255 | Rudolf Rupp | 15 July | |
| 256 | Jill Rosenthal | 19 August | |
| 257 | Joe Gliniewicz | 26 August | |
| 258 | Kay Mortensen | 2 September | |
| 259 | Jamie Lavis | 9 September | Originally a Patreon Picks episode |
| 260 | The Alpine Manor Murders | 16 September | |
| 261 | Shari Smith & Debra May Helmick | 22 September | Part 2–30 September |
| 262 | Samia Shahid | 7 October | Originally a Patreon Picks episode |
| 263 | Kim Barry | 14 October | |
| 264 | Andrew Gosden | 21 October | |
| 265 | Marea Yann | 28 October | |
| 266 | Circleville Letter Writer | 4 November | Originally a Patreon Picks episode |
| 267 | Brian Barrett | 11 November | |
| 268 | Colleen Stan | 18 November | Part 2–25 November |
| 269 | Caroline Crouch | 2 December | Originally a Patreon Picks episode |

=== 2024 ===
| Case | Title | Date | Notes |
|---|---|---|---|
| 270 | Meredith Kercher | 2 February | |
| 271 | Bonnie Clarke | 10 February | |
| 272 | The Annecy Shootings | 17 February | |
| 273 | The Beast of Mława | 24 February | Originally a Patreon Picks episode |
| 274 | Benjamin Amato | 2 March | |
| 275 | Michelle Hadley | 9 March | |
| 276 | Claire Acocks & Margaret Penny | 16 March | |
| 277 | Linda Slaten | 23 March | Originally a Patreon Picks episode |
| 278 | Alma Tirtschke | 30 March | Part 2–6 April |
| 279 | Zebb Quinn | 13 April | |
| 280 | The Stockton Arsonist | 20 April | Originally a Patreon Picks episode |
| 281 | Bibaa Henry & Nicole Smallman | 27 April | |
| 282 | April Tinsley | 4 May | |
| 283 | Kris Kremers & Lisanne Froon | 11 May | |
| 284 | Widden Hill Farm | 18 May | Originally a Patreon Picks episode |
| 285 | Louise Ellis | 25 May | |
| 286 | The Survivors' Network | 1 June | |
| 287 | Half & Susanne Zantop | 8 June | |
| 288 | Mark Van Dongen | 15 June | Originally a Patreon Picks episode |
| 289 | Stephen & Carol Baxter | 22 June | |
| 290 | The Crawford Family | 29 June | |
| 291 | David Pauley, Ralph Geiger & Timothy Kern | 6 July | |
| 292 | Monster of the Andes | 13 July | Originally a Patreon Picks episode |
| 293 | Jamie Faith | 17 August | Part 2–24 August |
| 294 | Ray & Jennie Kehlet | 31 August | |
| 295 | Nadia Kajouji & Mark Drybrough | 7 September | Originally a Patreon Picks episode |
| 296 | Aaron Bacon | 14 September | |
| 297 | Bluebelle | 21 September | |
| 298 | Bonnie Hood | 28 September | |
| 299 | Olga Chardymova | 5 October | Originally a Patreon Picks episode |
| 300 | Tegan Lane | 12 October | Part 2–19 October |
| 301 | Michella Welch & Jennifer Bastian | 26 October | |
| 302 | The De Gruchy Family | 2 November | Originally a Patreon Picks episode |
| 303 | Duncan MacPherson | 9 November | |
| 304 | The Staudte Family | 16 November | |
| 305 | Marshall Street | 23 November | |
| 306 | Ina & David Steiner | 30 November | Originally a Patreon Picks episode |

=== 2025 ===
| Case | Title | Date | Notes |
|---|---|---|---|
| 307 | The Night Caller | 15 February | Part 2–22 February |
| 308 | Ruth Finley | 1 March | |
| 309 | Lindsay Jellett | 8 March | Originally a Patreon Picks episode |
| 310 | Kalinka Bamberski | 15 March | |
| 311 | Russell Hill & Carol Clay | 22 March | |
| 312 | Dustin Wehde | 29 March | |
| 313 | Keith Hibbins | 5 April | Originally a Patreon Picks episode |
| 314 | Yarmila Falater | 12 April | |
| 315 | Operation Cacam | 19 April | |
| 316 | Gilbert Bogle & Margaret Chandler | 26 April | |
| 317 | Thomas Perez | 3 May | Originally a Patreon Picks episode |
| 318 | Tay Chow Lyang & Tony Tan Poh Chuan | 10 May | |
| 319 | Theresa Feury | 17 May | |
| 320 | Veronica Abouchuk & Kathleen Henry | 24 May | |
| 321 | Vincent Viafore | 31 May | Originally a Patreon Picks episode |
| 322 | William Tyrrell | 19 July | Part 2-26 July |
| 323 | The GPO Girl | 2 August | |
| 324 | Khalil Rayyan | 9 August | Originally a Patreon Picks episode |
| 325 | The Gilham Family | 16 August | |
| 326 | Cooper Harris | 23 August | |
| 327 | Rodrigo Rosenberg Marzano | 30 August | |
| 328 | Kirsty Jones | 6 September | Originally a Patreon Picks episode |
| 329 | Roseanne Beckett | 13 September | |
| 330 | David Birkett | 20 September | |
| 331 | Girl Meat Hunter | 27 September | |
| 332 | Bruce Miller | 4 October | Originally a Patreon Picks episode |
| 333 | Dianne Babcock | 11 October | |
| 334 | Nicole Meyer, Dassi Elrich & Elly Saper | 18 October | |
| 335 | Linda Brown | 25 October | |
| 336 | Tyler Clementi | 1 November | Originally a Patreon Picks episode |

=== 2026 ===
| Case | Title | Date | Notes |
|---|---|---|---|
| 337 | Test A.rtf | 7 March | Part 2–14 March; Part 3–21 March; Part 4–28 March |
| 338 | The Folbigg Children | 4 April | Part 2–11 April |
| 339 | Waco | 18 April | Part 2–25 April; Part 3–2 May |
| 340 | Elisabeth Membrey | 30 May | |
| 341 | The Christchurch Civic Creche | 6 June | |
| 342 | Julia Wallace | 13 June | |
| 343 | John Zera | 20 June | |
| 344 | Amerithrax | 27 June | |
| 345 | The Barking Murders | 4 July | |
| 346 | Megumi Yokota | 11 July | |
| 347 | Zahra Baker | 18 July | |
| 348 | Toyah Cordingley | 15 August | |
| 349 | Michael Wallace & David Castor | 22 August | |
| 350 | Alice Sebold & Tony Broadwater | 29 August | |
| 351 | Neelma, Kunal & Sidhi Singh | 5 September | |
| 352 | Gregory Smart | 12 September | |
| 353 | Jaidyn Leskie | 19 September | |
| 354 | The Gilgo Beach Serial Killings | 26 September | Part 2–3 October |
| 355 | Anna Lisa Raymundo | 31 October | |
| 356 | Lesley Howell & Trevor Buchanan | 7 November | |
| 357 | Wayne & Sharmon Stock | 14 November | |
| 358 | The Beltway Snipers | 21 November | Part 2–28 November |

== From the Files ==
In July 2019, it was announced that a new "informal companion" series, From the Files, would be aired monthly in the show's off week. However, it was announced in December 2019 that From the Files would be put on hiatus for 2020.

| Episode | Title | Date | Notes |
|---|---|---|---|
| 1 | Dark Web Murder for Hire with Eileen Ormsby | 6 July 2019 | Updates to cases 3, 21, 23, 24, 53, 54, 76, 87 |
| 2 | The Claremont Killer with Tim Clarke | 3 August 2019 | Updates to cases 14, 23, 48, 54, 85, 96 |
| 3 | Searching for the Beaumont Children with Stuart Mullins | 31 August 2019 | Updates to cases 3, 13, 37, 48, 56, 58, 65, 76, 85, 87 |
| 4 | From Frankston to Philip Island with Vikki Petraitis | 28 September 2019 | Updates to cases 13, 24, 30, 53, 56, 85, 109 |
| 5 | Who is Mr. Kipper? with David Videcette | 26 October 2019 | Updates to cases 76, 100, 109 |
| 6 | Reporting on the Port Arthur Tragedy with Gary Tippet | 23 November 2019 | Updates to cases 3, 21, 24, 30, 48, 54, 65, 85, 91, 103, 109 |
| 7 | Exposing a War Crime with Justin Watt | 2 June 2020 | First aired as a Bonus Interview–1 February 2020 |

== Casefile Archives ==
Starting in January 2026, the show began releasing reworked and updated versions of previously issued (either free of paywall) episodes. According to the show:

Casefile Archives is a series of special bonus releases revisiting the earliest years of the show. The re-run episodes have been completely edited, polished, re-recorded and freshly produced from start to finish to match our current production standards. They are not complete rewrites - our goal wasn’t to alter the cases or reshape the writing, but to preserve the original storytelling while giving the production the refinement it didn’t have when we started the show back in 2016. Where appropriate, updates have been added, but the core structure and storytelling remain faithful to the originals. Because of this, these re-releases may sound a little different to our recent episodes, but they allow us to bring some of the earliest episodes up to the technical quality listeners expect today.

Casefile Revisited

| Episode | Title | Date | Notes |
|---|---|---|---|
| 1 | The Wanda Beach Murders | 6 January 2026 | Reissue of Case 01 (which itself was a reissue) |
| 2 | The Somerton Man | 6 January 2026 | Reissue of Case 02 (which itself was a reissue) |
| 3 | Laura Bible & Ashley Freeman | 7 February 2026 | Reissue of Case 03 (which itself was a reissue) |
| 4 | The Eriksson Twins | 14 February 2026 | Reissue of Case 17 |
| 5 | The Frankston Serial Killer | 9 May 2026 | Reissue of Case 23 |
| 6 | The North Hollywood Shootout | 23 May 2026 | Reissue of Case 18 |
| 7 | Pamela Lawrence | 1 August 2026 | Reissue of Case 21 |
| 8 | Mr Cruel | 17 October 2026 | Reissue of Case 41 |

Casefile Extra

| Episode | Title | Date | Notes |
|---|---|---|---|
| 1 | Tina Herrmann, Kody Maynard & Stephanie Sprang | 9 January 2026 | Reissue of Premium Episode 39 |
| 2 | Mirna Salihin | 9 January 2026 | Reissue of Premium Episode 38 |
| 3 | Nicky Fleming | 21 February 2026 | Reissue of Premium Episode 31 |
| 4 | The Tunstall Family | 28 February 2026 | Reissue of Premium Episode 26 |
| 5 | Ben McDaniel | 16 May 2026 | Reissue of Premium Episode 40 |
| 6 | Greg Fleniken | 25 July 2026 | Casefile Extra |
| 7 | Maria Cruz | 8 August 2026 | Casefile Extra |
| 8 | Elena Milagro Hoyos | 10 October 2026 | Casefile Extra |
| 9 | Chad Shelton & Duane Johnson | 24 October 2026 | Casefile Extra |
