= Sven-Åke =

Sven-Åke is a Swedish first name. It may refer to:

- Sven Åke Christianson (born 1954), Swedish professor of psychology
- Sven-Åke Jansson (1937–2014), Swedish Army lieutenant general
- Sven-Åke Johansson (1943–2025), Swedish drummer, composer, author and visual artist
- Sven-Åke Lundbäck (born 1948), Swedish cross-country skier
- Sven-Åke Nilsson (born 1951), Swedish road racing cyclist
