= Murder of Urban Höglin and Heidi Paakkonen =

1989 New Zealand murder case

Urban Höglin and Heidi Paakkonen

Swedish tourists Sven Urban Höglin, aged 23, and his fiancée Heidi Birgitta Paakkonen, aged 21, disappeared while tramping on the Coromandel Peninsula of New Zealand in 1989. Police, residents, and military personnel conducted the largest land-based search undertaken in New Zealand, attempting to find the couple.

In December 1990, David Wayne Tamihere (born 1953) was convicted of murdering Höglin and Paakkonen, and sentenced to life imprisonment based largely on the testimony of three prison inmates, one of whom was subsequently convicted of perjury. He was released on parole in November 2010 after serving twenty years in prison, and continues to protest his innocence.

Höglin's body was discovered in 1991, revealing evidence which contradicted the police case against Tamihere, who filed a series of unsuccessful appeals during the 1990s. In 2023, Bob Jones claimed the lead detective on the case, John Hughes, admitted to him before he died that he had fabricated the evidence against Tamihere.

In July 2024, the New Zealand Court of Appeal decided that the false evidence presented at the original trial constituted a miscarriage of justice, but concluded there was still enough evidence to be satisfied beyond reasonable doubt of Tamihere's guilt. His conviction was upheld. On 31 March 2026, the Supreme Court of New Zealand overturned the Court of Appeal decision, quashed Tamihere's convictions and ordered a retrial. In October 2026, it was decided that the retrial would not be held, and all charges against David Tamihere were withdrawn.

== Disappearance ==
On 8 April 1989, backpacking tourists Urban Höglin and Heidi Paakkonen of Storfors, Värmland County, Sweden, went into the bush near Thames, a town on the Coromandel Peninsula on New Zealand's North Island. The couple vanished and were reported missing in May. Their disappearance led to an intense investigation under the name Operation Stockholm and attracted substantial media interest. Police, local residents, search and rescue and military personnel carried out the largest land-based search undertaken in New Zealand, performing grid-searches centred on Crosbie's Clearing, 12 km from Thames.

== Background ==
David Tamihere is the brother of former Labour MP John Tamihere. He had a prior conviction for the manslaughter of Mary Barcham, a 23-year-old woman in Auckland, whom he killed in 1972 when he was aged 18 by hitting her on the head with a rifle. In April 1986, Tamihere broke into an Auckland house, where he raped and threatened a 47-year-old woman for over six hours. He pleaded guilty but fled while on bail, and was living rough in the bush on the Coromandel Peninsula when Höglin and Paakkonen disappeared. Tamihere was not found until 1989, after which he was jailed for six and a half years for the 1986 offences. In 1992, he was found guilty of assaulting a 62-year-old woman in her home in 1985.

According to Tamihere, on 10 April 1989, he came across Höglin and Paakkonen's white Subaru, which was parked at the end of Tararu Creek Road and 'loaded with gear'. Tamihere broke into the car, planning on driving up to Auckland, but the next day he gave three visitors to the area a tour of the peninsula. He drove one of the tourists to Auckland the day after that and dumped the car at Auckland railway station.

Tamihere was picked up on the 1986 rape charge on 24 May 1989, two days before the story broke that Höglin and Paakkonen were missing. His link to the couple surfaced when one of the three tourists recognised photographs of their Subaru and told police in June that Tamihere had given him a ride in it. Tamihere, already in prison on the rape charge, was then charged with murdering Höglin and Paakkonen.

=== Trial of David Tamihere ===
The Crown's case against Tamihere in October 1990 was largely based on circumstantial evidence. Two trampers who visited Crosbie's Clearing on 8 April 1989 gave evidence that they saw a woman resembling Paakkonen. They spoke to the man she was with and later identified him as Tamihere. The trial judge ruled that due to incorrect identification techniques used by the police, their evidence was tainted and not admissible. However, on appeal by the Crown, the Court of Appeal allowed the trampers' testimony to be admitted, due to the quality of their evidence.

Three prison inmates, granted name suppression by the court, claimed that Tamihere confessed to murdering the couple. One of the inmates, later identified as Conchie Harris, said Tamihere claimed to have tied Höglin to a tree, beat him about his head with a lump of wood and sexually assaulted him. He said Tamihere also claimed to have raped Paakkonen, then strangled her, before dumping their bodies out to sea. He said Tamihere also claimed he had given Höglin's watch to his son.

In December 1990, the jury found Tamihere guilty of the murder and theft, and he was sentenced to life imprisonment with a ten-year non-parole period.

== Subsequent events ==
=== Secret Witness C ===
On 25 August 1995, five years after the trial, Witness C (Conchie Harris) swore an affidavit retracting the testimony he provided at the trial. He said police told him what to say and said: "a sum of money up to $100,000 was available should I decide to give a statement helpful to the Police". Harris also claimed police indicated they would support his early release at his parole hearing if he did what they wanted.

However, the existence of this affidavit only came to light a year later on 17 July 1996, when Harris spoke to broadcaster Paul Holmes in a prison telephone interview. He publicly admitted to lying at Tamihere's trial and confirmed that the affidavit he had signed in 1995, stating that he had lied and given false evidence, was the truth. He told Holmes that his original testimony against Tamihere had been "playing on his mind" and "they definitely have an innocent man inside". The affidavit states that the officer in charge of this deception was former Detective John Hughes (See Lead detective below).

Witness C later tried to withdraw his affidavit and claimed that his original trial testimony was the correct version of events. He said he only signed the affidavit because he and his family were under threat of violent reprisal because of his reputation as a jailhouse "nark". Twenty years later, long after Tamihere had been released on parole, jailhouse lawyer Arthur Taylor brought a private prosecution against Witness C for perjury. In August 2017, Witness C, who was still in prison for murder, was found guilty on eight charges of perjury. He was sentenced to a further eight years, seven months in prison, and died in prison in September 2021.

Taylor was represented in court by lawyer Murray Gibson, who said the perjury verdict against Witness C called into question everything about Tamihere's conviction. On 26 April 2018, the identity of Witness C was revealed as Robert Conchie Harris. He had originally been convicted of the double murder of a couple in 1983.

=== The lead detective ===
In November 2009, New Zealand journalist Pat Booth, formerly of the Auckland Star, alleged that the Crown prosecutor and the police inquiry head in the Tamihere case, John Hughes, were both leading figures in the earlier prosecution of Arthur Allan Thomas, which had involved the planting of evidence, perjury, and withholding of information and evidence from the defence. The Royal Commission into Thomas’s wrongful conviction found crucial evidence supplied by Hughes, which linked Thomas with the victims, was "wrong".

In November 2023, journalist Mike White reported in the Sunday Star-Times that John Hughes, who died in 2006, was friends with Bob Jones. Jones said Hughes bragged to him that "I nailed [Tamihere] by making up all the evidence". Hughes allegedly admitted to Jones that he "used three jailhouse snitches" to make up claims that Tamihere confessed to them while in prison.

=== Discarded evidence ===
In May 2017, Alan Ford, an experienced bushman, found a plastic bag containing three pairs of women's leggings in the rugged bush on the Whangamatā Peninsula about 15 km from where Höglin's remains had been found. Ford took the bag and clothing to Whangamatā police station. Two months later, a police constable emailed him saying that his senior officer had "no interest in the items" and that they would not be testing them. The constable said Ford could pick up the items the next time he came to town. On 7 July, Ford went to the police station but was told the items had been destroyed on 9 June, a month before the constable had indicated by email that the items still existed.

In an interview with Stuff, forensic scientist Dr Peter Cropp said that in his view the police's handling of this evidence was "appalling", and that DNA may have been found on the clothing, so it should have been sent to forensics experts for proper examination.

== Tamihere's appeals ==
In October 1991, ten months after Tamihere's conviction, pig hunters discovered Höglin's skeleton near Whangamatā, 73 km from where police alleged the murders took place. On the body was the watch which police had claimed at his trial Tamihere had given to his son following the murders. Discovery of the body also contradicted the testimony of a fellow prison inmate who said Tamihere had confessed to cutting up the bodies and throwing them into the ocean. Paakkonen's body has never been found.

Based on these evidential contradictions, Tamihere appealed his convictions. The Court of Appeal rejected the case in May 1992, finding there was "nothing substantive in defence claims that the skeleton revealed new evidence" and that the Crown had provided "convincing circumstantial proof". Tamihere’s lawyer, Christopher Ruthe, disagreed with the decision, stating it was "one of the most appalling judgments of the Court of Appeal you’ll ever come across".

In 1994, Tamihere was denied leave to appeal to the Privy Council.

=== Parole ===
On 3 November 2010, Tamihere was granted parole, to be released on 15 November. At a parole board hearing on 11 November 2011, he was said to have spent several months in hospital due to ongoing health issues but was otherwise actively involved in marae activities and carving, being actively supported by his family. His parole conditions were relaxed.

Tamihere continued to maintain his innocence while on parole, claiming he was framed by police. A 2012 interview with TV One's Sunday programme, in which he advanced this claim, was widely watched with 413,300 viewers. During filming, the TV One crew flew him by helicopter over areas prohibited to him by his parole conditions. While the parole board chose not to revoke his parole, police charged him in relation to the incident.

=== Second Court of Appeal hearing ===
On 21 April 2020, Tamihere was granted a royal prerogative of mercy by the Governor-General, Dame Patsy Reddy, on the advice of the Minister of Justice, Andrew Little, enabling the case to be reviewed again by the Court of Appeal. A two day hearing took place in November 2023, where two contentious issues were addressed. The first was the false testimony provided at the original trial by prison informant, Roberto Conchie Harris, who claimed Tamihere confessed to him. The second was the discovery of Höglin's body 70km away from the alleged murder site.

In July 2024, the Court of Appeal released its decision, finding that the evidence of Conchie Harris should not have been heard and that this was a miscarriage of justice. However, the Court did not set aside Tamihere's conviction, finding that the case against him was "very strong" and there was still enough evidence to prove his guilt beyond reasonable doubt. Evidence relied on included eyewitness identification of Tamihere, Tamihere's claims about his movements and actions, and his actions after the victims disappeared.

=== Supreme Court ===
Tamihere appealed to the Supreme Court which, in December 2024, announced it would hear his case. The hearing was held in August 2025. On the first day, Tamihere's lawyer, Murray Gibson, outlined six concerns about the case. One was that prison snitch, Roberto Conchie Harris, who testified that Tamihere confessed in prison was subsequently found guilty of perjury. Another 'witness,' Duane Davenport, was also found to have lied when he claimed Tamihere told him that after killing Höglin, he gave Höglin's watch to his son. When Höglin’s body was found nearly a year later, he was still wearing the watch, which proved he was lying.

Tamihere's defence also provided the Court with the affidavit from Sir Robert Jones, who said the officer who led the investigation into the murders, Detective Inspector John Hughes admitted, shortly after Tamihere was convicted, that “I nailed him by making up all the evidence".

The Supreme Court released its decision on 31 March 2026, overturning the Court of Appeal's decision, quashing Tamihere's convictions and directing that a new trial would need to be held. The Supreme Court concluded that the use of the jailhouse snitch evidence was a "fundamental error at trial which made the trial unfair", and also noted concerns about the Crown's case having been radically changed after Höglin's remains were found.

On 7 October 2026, Crown prosecutor Claire Patterson announced that a retrial would not be pursued, and David Tamihere was discharged. While Tamihere welcomed his exoneration, he regarded the outcome as "anti-climatic" since he had wanted a retrial to clear his name. Tamihere also thanked his legal team and said that he would be seeking compensation from the Crown.

== Media interest ==
The TV3 show Inside New Zealand: What's Your Verdict? re-examined the case with a television jury in 2007.

Filmmaker Bryan Bruce made a documentary Murder, They Said in 1996 examining the case, and wrote the book Hard Cases (2008), in which he claimed Tamihere was responsible but did not act alone. Despite Bruce's belief in Tamihere's guilt, he said he believed that Tamihere deserved a retrial due to the finding of Höglin's body which disproved key aspects of the prosecution's case.

In 1999, Leanne Pooley made a television documentary Relative Guilt about the impact on Tamihere's extended family of his arrest, trial and conviction. The documentary won Best Documentary at the 2000 Qantas Media Awards.

The case was covered in episode 209 of the true crime podcast Casefile.

In 2023, Ryan Wolf tackled the murder of Höglin and Paakkonen in 31 episodes of investigative podcast, GUILT (Season 3.) In an attempt to locate Paakkonen's remains, Wolf uncovered new evidence regarding the last movements of the Swedish tourists, as well as evidence which may implicate others besides Tamihere who were present at the time of the murder.

== See also ==
- List of solved missing person cases: 1950–1999
- Murder of Grace Millane
