= Morton Berger =

American sex offender

- Born: Morton Robert Berger; July 2, 1951 (age 75)
- Occupation: Teacher
- Status: Arizona State Prison Complex – Florence, South Unit; Arizona Department of Corrections number 174827; earliest release date June 20, 2202
- Convictions: 2003
- Criminal charges: Sexual exploitation of a minor
- Penalty: 200 years imprisonment

Morton Robert Berger (born July 2, 1951) is a former high school teacher from Phoenix, Arizona and a convicted child pornography collector. He was convicted in 2003 for possessing 20 pornographic images of children and sentenced to 200 years in prison without possibility of probation, parole, pardon or clemency. This sentence, which was the minimum available under Arizona law, was upheld by the Arizona Supreme Court in 2006. On February 26, 2007, the Supreme Court of the United States declined to hear a further appeal.

== The crime ==
Berger was a history teacher at Cortez High School in Phoenix. In June 2002, police got a tip that his credit card number had been used to buy pornographic images from a site hosted in Dallas. A raid on his home revealed a large collection of child pornography that he had collected over the previous six years. He was a member of the Wonderland Club porn-trading ring that required members to have at least 10,000 images in order to join. He was charged with 35 specimen counts of sexual exploitation of a minor, each charge relating to one image. After Berger turned down a plea bargain, prosecutors dropped 15 of the charges to avoid overwhelming the jury with lewd images. In January 2003, a jury convicted Berger of the remaining 20 counts against him.

== The sentence ==
Berger was convicted of 20 counts of second-degree dangerous crimes against children, which carry a minimum sentence of 10 years in prison without possibility of parole, probation, pardon, or clemency. Arizona has some of the strictest laws in the nation on child abuse and exploitation. Only five states have a longer minimum sentence for possession of child pornography or its equivalent. Arizona's 10-year minimum is longer than the maximum for this offense (or its equivalent) in 35 states, and equal to the maximum in nine states. Under federal sentencing guidelines of the day, he would have faced a minimum of only five years in prison.

Prosecutors argued that since the possession of each image was a separate crime, the sentences had to run consecutively. The sentencing judge agreed, and sentenced Berger to the mandatory minimum sentence of 10 years per count, adding up to 200 years in prison. Prosecutors recommended a sentence of 340 years (17 years per count), while the maximum sentence available was 480 years (24 years per count). All three sentences would have all but assured that Berger would die in prison.

== The appeals ==
Berger's lawyers appealed the sentence, citing the Eighth Amendment to the United States Constitution, which prohibits "cruel and unusual punishment". They argued that although each 10-year sentence was not too long in itself, the cumulative total of 200 years was grossly disproportionate to Berger's conduct overall, given that it was a longer sentence than those imposed for murder or rape of a child in Arizona. They also cited Berger's lack of a prior criminal record. The Arizona Court of Appeals upheld the sentence, feeling bound by precedent to do so. Judge Donn Kessler concurred in part and dissented in part, believing that Berger should have gotten a new sentencing hearing. Berger then appealed to the Arizona Supreme Court, which ruled on May 10, 2006.

Some of the justices were sympathetic to Berger's arguments. Vice Chief Justice Rebecca Berch described the mandatory minimum and consecutive sentencing rules, as well as the exclusion of probation, parole or pardon as a "triple whammy," observing that "it far exceeds the sentence imposed for similar crimes in any jurisdiction and exceeds the penalties regularly imposed in Arizona for crimes that result in serious bodily injury or even death to victims."

Despite its reservations, however, the Supreme Court, like the Court of Appeals before it, felt bound by precedent to uphold the sentence. It held that consecutive sentences which add up to very long sentences are not unconstitutional, provided that each of the individual sentences which comprise it are not themselves unconstitutional. The decision was virtually unanimous, with Berch concurring in part and dissenting in part. On February 26, 2007, the Supreme Court of the United States declined to hear a further appeal.

In 2011, Berger petitioned the United States District Court for the District of Arizona for a writ of habeas corpus as a last-ditch effort to have his sentence overturned. The petition was denied.

Berger, Arizona Department of Corrections inmate number 174827, is serving his sentence at Arizona State Prison Complex – Florence, South Unit. His earliest possible release date is June 6, 2202.
