= Death of Kevin Hjalmarsson =

Swedish criminal case

Kevin Hjalmarsson
- Born: 1994; Sweden
- Died: 16 August 1998 (aged 3–4); Arvika, Sweden
- Cause of death: Suffocation
- Body discovered: 16 August 1998
- Known for: Being the victim of an unsolved murder

Four-year-old Kevin Hjalmarsson was found dead in Arvika, Sweden on 16 August 1998. Two brothers, then five and seven years old, were accused of murdering him and were claimed to have confessed. The brothers were extensively investigated and interrogated, but they were never charged with a crime.

On 27 March 2018, all suspicions against both brothers were dismissed by Swedish police after a lengthy second investigation of the case. Each brother was expected to receive one million SEK in damages.

== Case ==
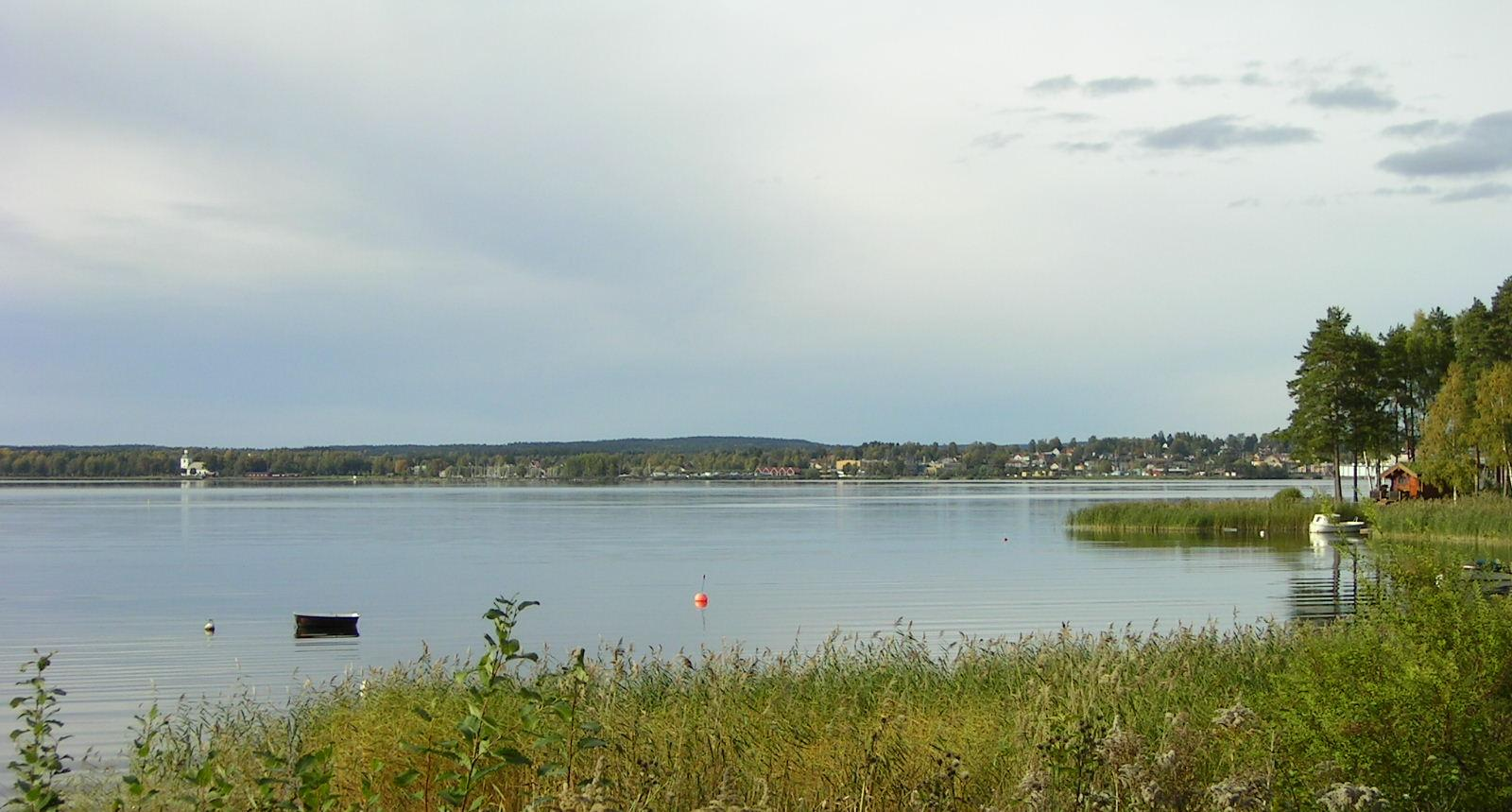
Kyrkviken, part of Glafsfjorden lake in Arvika

Soon after the death of Kevin Hjalmarsson, police theorized that he had been murdered with a stick which had been pressed against his throat, ending in his suffocation, and that his body had then been left on the shore of Kyrkviken, part of Glafsfjorden lake in Arvika, 30 m (98 ft) from the presumed murder site. There were no drag marks on the ground or on Kevin's body that would have been consistent with a body that had been transported from one location to another. First responders were called about a drowning at Glafsfjorden; an ambulance was dispatched at 21:22 and took the boy to hospital, where the police first inspected the body. It was initially speculated that a pedophile was the perpetrator. Police at Länskriminalen in Värmland made an analysis of the victim and his life up to his death. Two brothers, five and seven years old, were accused of the murder and allegedly confessed. During further investigations, psychologist Sven Å. Christianson, professor at the psychological institute in Stockholm, was called in. He was later criticized for his handling of the Thomas Quick case.

== Treatment of the children ==
In May 2017, the brothers came forward and stated that the police used threats and rewards to mislead them into "confessing" the crime. One recounted, “They almost threw it at me and would say ‘yes this has happened’. It was a lot of pressure that was the thing that made it so scary.” and “I remember that I was afraid of the police [but] if I did what they wanted, they would be happy and satisfied.”

The police had no recording of any confession, despite producing video and audio recordings of several other interrogations, which display serious pressure put on the boys to confess.

The boys were never convicted of the murder, so they were legally only regarded as suspects. Both boys were taken by social services for treatment and psychological help at a children's institution. The state imprisoned the children away from their parents and their friends and community for years, and tried several times to make the separation permanent. Years later, because all the state efforts failed, and no foster parents could be found, the brothers were returned to their parents.

== Criticism of the investigation and media reports ==
In Linda Kidane's documentary Mordet på Kevin, broadcast on Sveriges Radio on 2 October 2015, the investigation was presented as a complete success and Kidane confirmed that the two brothers had murdered Kevin Hjalmarsson. After Janne Josefsson and other journalists started to look into the case, the documentary was removed from Sveriges Radio's official website.

In April 2017, Dagens Nyheter published an article that analysed the investigation of Kevin Hjalmarsson's death. The article highlighted several faults in the initial investigation, such as how interrogations of the two boys were conducted and how the boys were led through the crime scene. The two boys were subjected to extensive interrogations; this was deemed counterproductive by experts on children since it could lead to false confessions. Among those with a critical view were psychology professor Ann-Christin Cederborg, who said that the interrogations of the two boys were conducted against all rules concerning how an interrogation should be conducted. According to Cederborg, the methods used on the boys produced false confessions. The two children were subjected to threats and rewards depending on what they answered during interrogations. Neither the boys nor their parents had any legal representation during the entire investigation and interrogations. The alleged confessions that led to the closing of the investigation were never recorded on audio or video.

At the same time that Dagens Nyheter was investigating the case, a documentary by Dan Josefsson, Fallet Kevin, was in production.

The documentary showed parts of the video interrogations with the boys. The first episode of the three-part documentary was broadcast on Sveriges Television on the Dokument inifrån show in 2017, a few weeks after Dagens Nyheter published their first article about the case.

On 8 May 2017, the district attorney decided to re-open the investigation into the case.

On 27 March 2018, all suspicions against the two brothers were completely dismissed. Police also indicated that they now believed Kevin died in an accident.

On 9 March 2022, it was announced at a press conference by justice minister Morgan Johansson that both brothers would be awarded 1 million (SEK) each in damages. This was done ex gratia, as it was decided by the government.

In June 2022, the case was covered in episode 214 of the true crime podcast Casefile.

== See also ==
- List of solved missing person cases
- List of unsolved deaths
