= Xue family murder and abandonment =

Murder and abandonment in New Zealand

Nai Yin Xue
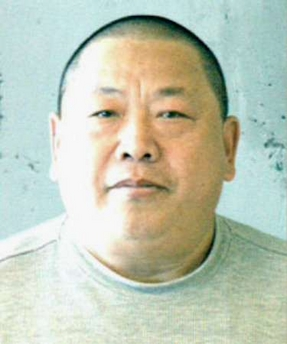
- Nai Yin Xue mugshot
- Spouse: Anan Liu (2004–murdered 2007)
- Children: Grace Xue, Qian Xun Xue (abandoned 2007)
- Status: Imprisoned
- Conviction: Murder
- Penalty: Life imprisonment, 12 years without parole

Details
- Country: New Zealand

Widely circulated image of Xue and his daughter at Southern Cross station

On 11 September 2007, Anan Liu (劉安安) was murdered by her husband Nai Yin Xue (薛乃印) in Mount Roskill, Auckland, New Zealand. Nai Yin Xue left the country for Australia with their three-year-old daughter, Qian Xun Xue (薛千寻 ), later nicknamed "Pumpkin" by police and media reports, subsequently abandoning her at Southern Cross station in Melbourne on 15 September 2007. The girl was found soon after, leading to the discovery of Anan Liu's murder and the disappearance of Nai Yin Xue, who became the subject of a manhunt.

Xue fled to the United States, settling undercover across the southern states, before being captured by members of the ethnic Chinese community of Chamblee, Georgia and handed over to police. He was deported to New Zealand, and convicted of the murder of his wife in June 2009. He refused to confess to the murder until a parole hearing in 2020, when he finally expressed remorse.

The case attracted widespread media coverage in both Australia and New Zealand.

== Background ==
Nai Yin Xue was born in approximately 1953 or 1954. He lived in Fushun, Liaoning, where he had his eldest daughter Grace with his first wife. Xue claimed that he emigrated to New Zealand in 1980. Stuff dates his immigration around 1990. The Sydney Morning Herald and The New Zealand Herald wrote that Xue arrived in 1996, going by the first name Michael. He was joined by his first wife and daughter in 1999. While China does not allow dual citizenship, US authorities stated that Xue held both Chinese and New Zealand citizenship. Xue worked as a tai chi instructor, claiming to be a tai chi "grandmaster" and that he served as "the master of eight martial arts societies and two gongfu schools" between the ages of 8 and 18. He was based out of Auckland, writing about martial arts for numerous magazines and publishing a Chinese-language newspaper, the Chinese Times, from a shop in New Lynn. In 1998, Xue released an autobiography.

In 2000, Xue divorced his wife, who returned to China. The same year, a few weeks after the divorce, Xue left his daughter Grace, then aged 19, to look for work opportunities. Grace located her father a few months later, but he refused to reestablish contact with her. In a 2006 Unitec student documentary, Xue expressed regret for abandoning his first daughter and voicing a desire to care for his second daughter Qian Xun. Director Tony Wright described Xue as "lov[ing] the limelight. He was very vain". By 2007, Grace Xue had graduated the University of Auckland, become engaged and was mother to a one-year-old boy.

Anan Liu was born in 1980, in Changsha, Hunan. She arrived in Auckland on 19 April 2002 to learn English, going by the first name Annie. She met Nai Yin Xue after moving into his house as a boarder. After failing her language test, Liu's visa expired, due to which she chose to marry Xue to remain in New Zealand. Their marriage was registered in July 2003.

=== Marriage and abuse ===
The couple lived at 26 Keystone Avenue, near Dominion Road in Mount Roskill, which was made up of two flats with a shared kitchen. The couple's marriage had been fairly happy until she had given birth to his daughter, Qian Xun "Clare" Xue, in 2004; Xue then became extremely aggressive and violent towards Liu for the baby being a girl.

Liu had been living in fear of her abusive husband since the child was born, having previously taken a protection order out against him after a particularly violent attack. On 28 July 2007, she had to flee with Qian Xun to a woman's refuge in Wellington after he threatened to murder her. They found their way to the Johnsonville home of Weihong Song, who rented out rooms. It was ascertained that Song and Liu began to have feelings for each other, as his wife and daughter were away in China. When Xue found out about this, he purchased an axe to kill her and drove down to Wellington to do so. Xue broke into the home and began violently searching the rooms rented out. Song's dog sounded the alarm, and, with a rifle in his hand, Song chased Xue away. A speed camera in Levin at 3:31 a.m. recorded Xue's drive back to Auckland.

Xue and Liu got back together shortly afterward for the sake of their child, but Xue continued to fear his wife was having an affair.

== Initial case ==
On Tuesday, 11 September 2007, Liu was seen by her Keystone Avenue flatmates Zhengye Zhang and his wife Ling Liu in the kitchen. At 6:46 p.m. she went to the nearby supermarket, and paid with Eftpos. That night, Zhang and Ling Liu went out on one of their regular walks around Mount Roskill; they would testify that they left at 8 p.m., and were back between 10 and 11 p.m. It was sometime during this time that Nai Yin Xue murdered his wife Anan by strangling her with a necktie. Forensics indicated it took her three minutes to die. He then crudely left her body in the boot of their car, a 1993 Honda Rafaga in silver.

At 12:27 a.m. on Wednesday, Xue visited a central Auckland ASB vault and checked his safety deposit box. At 2 a.m., police constable Terrance Logan pulled him over on the southern motorway, and asked him where he was going. Xue lied, claiming he was going home when he was actually heading in the opposite direction. He then organised a flight to Melbourne with three-year-old Qian Xun, who was unaware of the death of her mother.

Qian Xun Xue was abandoned near the base of an escalator at Melbourne's Southern Cross station on Saturday 15 September 2007 by her father, Nai Yin Xue, who boarded a flight to Los Angeles later that day. Originally unable to ascertain her real name, police in Melbourne nicknamed the child Pumpkin due to the Pumpkin Patch brand clothing she was wearing at the time. "Pumpkin" was soon placed in emergency foster care on 16 September.

On Monday 17 September, police learned the identities of the girl and her father, who had flown from Auckland two days prior to the abandonment. The girl's mother remained missing until her body was found on Wednesday 19 September in the boot of Xue's Honda Rafaga at their family home in the Auckland suburb of Mount Roskill.

== Police handling ==
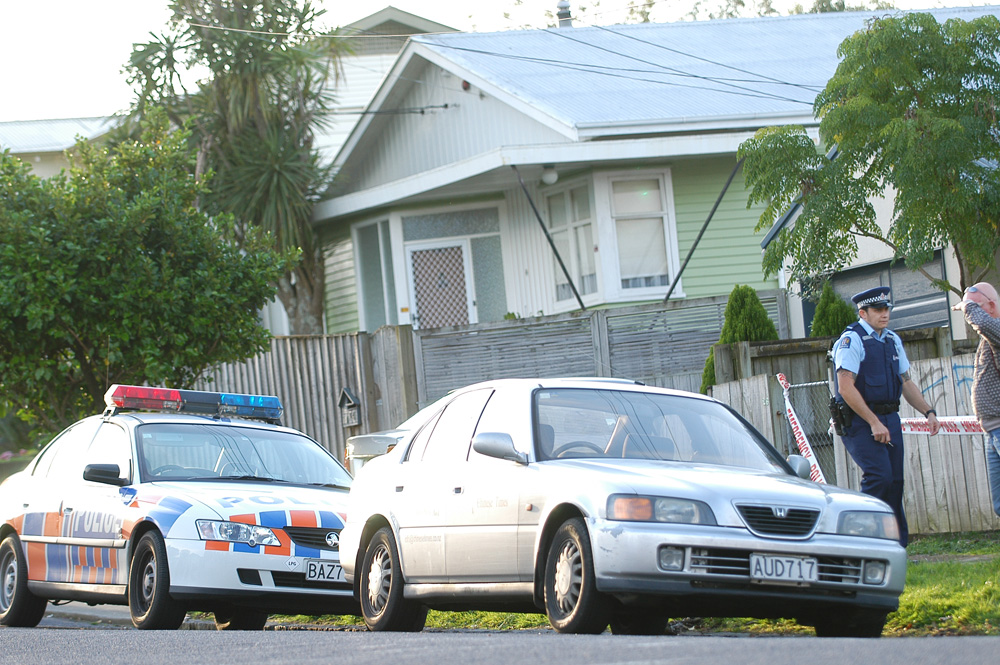
New Zealand Police left the Honda Rafaga, where Ms Liu's body was later found (inside its boot), untouched for two days.

Victoria Police gave information about Xue to Interpol, the New Zealand and US police on 16 September. Once Ms Liu's body was found, an arrest warrant for Xue was issued by New Zealand Police on 20 September and sent to Interpol in the United States who were quick to issue a 'red notice' asking the Los Angeles Police Department (LAPD) to find the wanted man. However, the LAPD claimed they did not receive an arrest warrant from Interpol and that they required a warrant directly from New Zealand. New Zealand police were quick to refute the claim and did not require to send another to the LAPD. The Federal Bureau of Investigation also offered their help in finding Xue.

New Zealand police were criticised for "bungling" the investigation, including failure to discover Liu's body in the Honda for at least two days, and slow response to issue a warrant for the arrest of Xue, allowing him to disappear in the US.

The United States Marshals Service issued a wanted poster for Xue, describing him as 'armed and dangerous'. They recommended that if Xue was spotted, he should not be confronted. He was also on the highly viewed television show America's Most Wanted. Xue was subsequently seen in Houston, Texas; Biloxi, Mississippi; and Mobile, Alabama.

== Arrest, trial and conviction ==
On Thursday 28 February 2008, a group of six people living in an apartment block in Chamblee, near Atlanta, Georgia recognised Xue from a photograph in the Chinese-language press. They attempted to inform the police but had difficulty in making themselves understood. In frustration, they captured him themselves. They removed his pants and tied them around his legs. They used his belt to tie his hands behind his back until police arrived to arrest him.

Xue initially attempted to provide a false name but he was identified from his New Zealand driver's licence. He had been on the run for 24 weeks. His overstay in the US without an appropriate visa meant that he was liable for deportation rather than extradition.

Xue was deported to New Zealand on 9 March 2008 to face murder charges over the death of his wife. His trial began on 2 June 2009. The prosecution presented evidence of ongoing violence and threats by Xue to his wife, while the defence argued that Liu had been unfaithful and died in a sexual misadventure. On 20 June, Xue was found guilty of Liu's murder. On 31 July, Xue was sentenced to life imprisonment with a minimum non-parole period of twelve years.

== Custody ==
Custody of the child was sought by her maternal grandmother, Liu Xiao Ping, from China. The child also has a half-sister, Grace Xue, who claims also to have been abandoned by their father at the age of 19, weeks after she arrived in a foreign country. The half-sister, by now 27, expressed an interest in caring for the child although they had never met.

Qian Xun returned to Auckland on 24 September 2007 where she was soon reunited with her grandmother. On 4 October 2007, the Family Court in New Zealand granted custody of Qian Xun to her grandmother, and visitation rights to her half-sister, Grace Xue. Shortly after, Qian Xun returned to China with her grandmother on 6 October 2007.

A trust fund for public donations, set up by Grace Xue, raised $NZ40,000 but the money was rejected by Qian Xun's grandmother. The money is now likely to be held in trust for Qian Xun's future use.

== In popular culture ==
The case was featured in an episode of the television show America's Most Wanted. It was also documented by the Casefile True Crime Podcast.
