= Facebook murder =

2012 murder in the Netherlands

The Facebook murder (Dutch: Facebookmoord) is a term coined by Dutch media for the murder of 15-year-old Winsie Hau on 14 January 2012 by the then 14-year-old Jinhua K. in Arnhem, the Netherlands. Hau's father was also injured in the attack. The case was given this name because the motive lay in the escalation of a teenage argument on the social media and social networking service Facebook.

== Events ==
Winsie 'Joyce' Hau (Note: Born in Hong Kong, Hau's given name was Winsie and the name 'Joyce' was the English alias she had started using in secondary school.) and 16-year-old Polly W. (Note: Due to the right to privacy, media in the Netherlands routinely withhold the identity of people charged with or convicted of a crime and often substitute initials for names.) were best friends until they had a falling out in October 2011 during a birthday party at a pool hall in Arnhem. Over the following weeks, the girls continued to argue online until Hau made remarks on Facebook on supposed promiscuous behaviour by her opponent. This resulted in Polly W. asking her friend, the 17-year-old Wesley C. from Rotterdam, to deal with the situation, who then contracted Jinhua K. from Capelle aan den IJssel to "teach [Hau] a lesson".

On 14 January 2012, Jinhua K. went to Hau's residence in Arnhem, armed with a knife. He rang the doorbell and stabbed Hau repeatedly in the face and neck when she answered the door. Her father, 49-year-old Chun Nam Hau, attempted to intervene and sustained knife wounds to his face and arms. Hau died of her injuries in hospital on 19 January 2012.

== Verdict ==
Jinhua K. was sentenced to a year in juvenile detention and three years in judicial involuntary commitment, of which one year was conditional.

Wesley C. and Polly K. were both sentenced to two years in juvenile detention and judicial involuntary commitment, the maximum sentence possible under Dutch criminal law for juveniles, for conspiring to commit and purposely contributing to the murder. The public prosecutor asked to have the two tried as adults due to the severity of the case, and demanded five years in prison and judicial involuntary commitment, but the court ruled against this.

The public prosecutor appealed the verdict. The appeal was during a non-public case in July and August 2013. On 27 August 2013, the court of appeals upheld the earlier ruling.

== Aftermath ==
Jinhua K. had shown some improvements during his time in a mental health facility, though psychologists had noted that he was at a low to moderate risk of reoffending, citing examples of impulsive behaviour, lowered empathy and occasional lack of cooperation with behavioural interventions.

In April 2018, Jinhua K. and an unidentified older man committed an armed robbery in Sint-Oedenrode. The two posed as prospective buyers of expensive computer equipment, having contacted the victim through his online listing. While stealing the equipment, they threatened to shoot the victim, his girlfriend and their infant if they attempted to intervene. A few weeks later, the two men were arrested.

Hau's father expressed his lack of surprise at Jinhua K's reoffending, stating that "he is severely disturbed; that was evident from (Winsie's) murder".

== In popular culture ==
In 2017, the Facebook murder was adapted by Dutch public broadcaster BNNVARA for the episode Unlike of the crime drama television series Van God Los.

On 8 July 2023, the Australian true crime podcast Casefile detailed the case of Winsie Hau in their 254th episode.

== See also ==
- Criticism of Facebook
- Murder in Dutch law
