= Murder of Janelle Patton =

2002 murder on Norfolk Island

Coordinates: 29.019174°S 167.967117°E

Janelle Patton
- Patton in an undated photo
- Born: c. 1972
- Died: 31 March 2002; Norfolk Island

Janelle Patton was a 29-year-old Sydney-born woman who was murdered on Norfolk Island on 31 March 2002. The case made national headlines in Australia and New Zealand, as she was the first person to be murdered on Norfolk Island since 1893.

== Background and murder ==
Patton had initially relocated from Sydney, New South Wales, to Norfolk Island, an Australian territory to the northwest of New Zealand's North Island, in her late twenties; the move came after feeling dissatisfied and depressed with the state of her life on the mainland. Patton had stated to various friends and family that she simply wanted to "get away" from the chaos of life in a big city. In addition to personal and work prospects, the young lady was seeking a fresh start in her love life after a number of failed and tumultuous relationships in Sydney. One abusive ex-boyfriend had broken her jaw. With her sights set on Norfolk Island, Patton took a brief trip to the territory and secured a position working at one of the island's hotels, and an apartment.

It was later stated by Patton's family and friends on the island that she continued to be disappointed in the men she was seeing there. Allegedly, and whether she was aware of it or not, Patton had been dating at least one man who was already in a relationship; in a tense confrontation with an angry girlfriend, a woman reportedly slapped Patton across the face. At the time of her murder, Janelle was looking forward to a visit from her parents. Her parents' flight arrived from mainland Australia just one day before her murder; they stayed at a nearby hotel while Patton stayed at her apartment. It is unclear why her parents did not stay with their daughter.

Patton planned to take her parents to lunch the next day, after her morning hotel shift, saying she would stop by to pick them up by 1:00. The time came and went but she failed to show and did not contact anyone. Patton was last seen going on her morning walk before work along a coastal track near her home. She also appeared on CCTV from a grocery store. Her parents began searching that afternoon, bumping into one of her colleagues and, eventually, her landlady; neither had seen Patton since that morning. Later that evening, her parents decided to report her missing at the police station.

Soon after the Pattons reported their daughter missing, a woman's body matching Janelle's general description was discovered by two tourists from New Zealand. The body was discovered at Cockpit Waterfall Reserve, at the opposite end of the island from where Patton was last seen, wrapped in a large black plastic sheet. Janelle's identity was confirmed by her landlady, who wanted to spare her parents the sight of the body.

It was believed by medical examiners that Patton had fought against her attacker, as her body bore several defensive wounds, primarily to her hands. She apparently managed to grab onto the blade of the killer's knife in an attempt to stop the prolonged attack, her thumb nearly being severed. Various shards of broken glass, plastic, and sand were found in her hair and her body was covered in bruises, leading examiners to believe she was struck with a glass bottle or a metallic pole, or something similar. Patton had endured a long attack, suffering a broken pelvis and ankle as well as a fractured skull — the result of being stabbed with great force through her eyeball. She was also stabbed over 65 times. The ultimate cause of death was a stab wound to the chest that punctured her lung.

== Arrest ==
The investigation into Patton's murder was protracted and difficult, although the main forensics were Patton's defensive wounds, the black sheet she was wrapped in, and pieces of green glass in her hair. Eventually, on 1 February 2006, Glenn Peter Charles McNeill, a 28-year-old chef from New Zealand, was arrested for her murder near the city of Nelson, on the South Island of New Zealand, after being identified by an Australian Federal Police investigation. He was subsequently extradited to Norfolk Island and formally charged with the crime. At the Norfolk Island Court of Petty Sessions McNeill claimed he had smoked marijuana that day and that he had accidentally run over Patton with his car, a statement he later retracted. He was transferred to Silverwater Correctional Centre in Sydney.

== Trial ==
On 1 February 2007, McNeill formally went on trial for the murder. A press blackout was imposed by the judge, Chief Justice Mark Weinberg, to prevent any dilution of the limited potential jury pool in Norfolk Island. On 1 March 2007, McNeill told the Supreme Court, "I did not kill Janelle Patton", "I did not abduct her" and "I did not see Janelle Patton that day". He said he could not recall what he had told police earlier, but "would have admitted to anything" due to his mental health problems. The trial ended on 9 March 2007 when the 11-person jury returned a guilty verdict, although the question of motive and an explanation for unidentified female DNA found on the body remained unclear. On 25 July 2007, McNeill was sentenced to 24 years in prison by Chief Justice Weinberg in the Supreme Court of Norfolk Island sitting in Sydney.

== Appeals ==
McNeill appealed his conviction to a Full Court of the Federal Court on grounds that included that his statement to the police should not have been admitted as evidence against him. The Full Court, Chief Justice Black, and Justices Lander and Besanko, dismissed his appeal. The High Court of Australia refused special leave to appeal on 14 November 2008.

== Release ==
McNeill was released on 31 January 2024, and immediately deported to New Zealand.

== Media ==
- The case was covered by Bella Fiori - The Murder of Janelle Patton on 27 July 2021
- The case was covered by Casefile True Crime Podcast on 3 December 2016.
- The case was covered by Crime Investigation Australia on 28 April 2009.
