= Murder of Kay Mortensen =

2009 crime in Utah, United States

Kay Mortensen
- Born: July 6, 1939; Ephraim, Utah
- Died: November 16, 2009 (aged 70); Payson, Utah
- Cause of death: Homicide
- Education: Snow College; Utah State University; University of Utah
- Occupation: Professor of mechanical engineering
- Employer: Brigham Young University
- Spouse(s): Hermona Anderson, Darla Mortensen

Kay Mortensen (July 6, 1939 – November 16, 2009) was an American retired professor of mechanical engineering at Brigham Young University who was murdered at his home in 2009. After family members were initially charged with the crime, the son of a friend of Mortensen was charged and convicted of the murder.

== Biography ==
Mortensen was born to Sherman and Roxie Mortensen in Ephraim, Utah, on July 6, 1939. He graduated from Snow College, Utah State University, and finally from the University of Utah where he received a Ph.D. in metallurgy. He was a professor of mechanical engineering at Brigham Young University for 37 years where he taught courses in manufacturing design, engineering technology, and mechanical engineering until his retirement. Three weeks before his murder, he was released from serving as a missionary for the Church of Jesus Christ of Latter-day Saints in the Provo Mission at Cove Fort, Utah (now part of the St. George Mission).

== Death ==
On November 16, 2009, at about 7 p.m., Mortensen's daughter-in-law Pam Mortensen called 911 to report that she and her husband Roger, Mortensen's son, had arrived at Mortensen's home and had been promptly tied up by two young men described as clean-cut white males. After the men left, Roger and Pam freed themselves, Pam called 911, and Roger went upstairs to find that Mortensen had been murdered. Kent Carroll, a neighbor of Mortensen's family, said they were planning to gather at the house Monday evening to play board games. Mortensen's wife, Darla, was returning from Salt Lake County where she had gone to be with her daughter, who was having a baby.

=== Investigation ===
Mortensen's son, Roger Kay Mortensen, 48, and daughter-in-law Pamela Mortensen, 34, were eventually charged with the murder. They were arrested on August 4, 2010, and booked into the Utah County jail. The police claimed that Roger's and Pam's stories were inconsistent. A search of Roger's home revealed he had possession of marijuana, possession of drug paraphernalia and possession of a firearm by a restricted person. They also found a hidden AK-47 and a 12-gauge shotgun. A .22 caliber revolver was also found in a safe in the garage. A grand jury was impaneled, which found that Roger and Pam should stand trial for the older Mortensen's murder.

On December 7, 2010, after serving four months in jail, Utah County exonerated Roger and Pamela Mortensen of the murder of Roger's father. Prosecutors moved to dismiss charges against the couple. That same day, they arrested two 23-year-old men from Vernal, Utah—Benjamin David Rettig and Martin Cameron Bond—after Martin Bond's ex-wife called police, turning him in. Bond was the son of a close friend of Mortensen. They were both charged by Utah County with aggravated murder, aggravated burglary and aggravated kidnapping. An anonymous informant advised police of the whereabouts of the suspects. When confronted, Bond showed detectives where he had allegedly buried weapons to conceal them. They found 14 shotguns, rifles and handguns buried at a location in Vernal and other weapons in a septic tank at a park in the area. The firearms had the serial numbers scratched off. Rettig was in possession of Roger Mortensen's driver's license. Rettig claimed that he and Bond had tied up Pamela and Roger Mortensen after the older Mortensen's throat had already been cut.

Rettig pleaded guilty in 2011 and is serving a sentence of 25 years to life. After nearly five hours of deliberation, a jury found Bond guilty of aggravated murder, three counts of aggravated kidnapping, and one count each of aggravated burglary and aggravated robbery. Bond was sentenced to life in prison without parole, and his appeal of the conviction was denied by the Utah Supreme Court in 2015.

== Media ==
Mortensen's murder was the subject of a 2013 episode of On the Case with Paula Zahn entitled "Bound by the Truth", and a 2013 episode of Dateline NBC entitled "Mystery at Payson Canyon". More recently, the investigation was also the subject of the 2018 final 10th episode entitled, “Collateral Damage” of Discovery+’s “Broken Trust”’s series, and “Trace of Evil”’s episode entitled "The Perplexing Case of Kay Mortensen" which originally aired on June 15, 2021. It was also the subject of a 2025 podcast entitled "Doomsday Prepper" covered by MrBallen.

== See also ==
- List of Casefile True Crime Podcast episodes, Episode 258
