= Samantha Azzopardi =

Australian con artist

Surreptitious photo of Azzopardi released by An Garda Síochána in November 2013 to aid in her identification.

Samantha Lyndell Azzopardi (born 21 August 1988) is an Australian con artist who has been accused of many instances of conning families and authorities, not only in her native Australia but also in Ireland and Canada. In May 2021, the Melbourne Magistrates Court sentenced her to two years imprisonment.

== Early life ==
Samantha Lyndell Azzopardi was born in Campbelltown, New South Wales, Australia, on 21 August 1988, of Maltese heritage.

== Fraudster vs Identity Theft Victim ==
"Samantha Azzopardi the Fraudster" has long blonde hair, and light skin.

“Samantha Azzopardi the Identity Theft Victim” has short red hair, an eyebrow and lip piercing and darker skin.

They are two different people who happen to share the exact same legal name. For more than six years, the serial conwoman weaponized this name coincidence to steal the identity and government benefits of the innocent Melbourne woman, creating an ongoing legal and financial nightmare.

== Criminal activities ==
Azzopardi first came to the attention of authorities in Rockhampton, Australia, in November 2007 when she was 19. Azzopardi used the name Dakota Johnson as a fake identity (no connection to the actress). In September 2010, a Samantha Azzopardi was charged with posing as student Dakota Johnson at Brisbane State High School. In 2010, at age 22, Azzopardi told authorities in Brisbane, Australia, that she was a 14-year-old runaway named Dakota Johnson who had arrived from Europe and been abandoned. A week earlier Azzopardi falsely represented herself to be Dakota Johnson at Mt St Michael's College in Ashgrove. She received a $500 fine and a suspended sentence. In September 2010, she tried to enroll in at least two schools in Brisbane, posing as a student, but was rejected from the second school after her reference letter was found to be fraudulent.

Azzopardi was found outside the General Post Office, Dublin (GPO) in October 2013 by officers from Garda Síochána, wandering up and down and apparently unable to speak English. She came to be known as the "GPO Girl". The police believed that she was the victim of sex trafficking and was around 14 years of age. When she was eventually identified, the opinion of the Garda Síochána was divided; some maintained that she had not committed a crime as she had not actually claimed anything had been done to her and so needed mental health treatment, whereas others wanted her charged for wasting police time.

In September 2014, Azzopardi walked into a health centre in Calgary, Canada, claiming her name was Aurora Hepburn and that she was the victim of a sexual assault and abduction. The police spent an estimated CA$150,000 (A$166,000), assembling a case, only to be informed of her identity. Azzopardi was charged with public mischief. In December 2014, the Canadian courts sentenced her to two months detention, which she had already served, and deported her to Australia a week later, accompanied by a Canadian Border Services Agency officer, so that she did not disappear en route.

In late 2016, Azzopardi enrolled at the Good Shepherd School at Marrickville in New South Wales, claiming to be a 13-year-old named Harper Hart. In June 2017, she was charged with "dishonestly obtaining financial advantage by deception, for the education, counselling, food, accommodation and electronics she was given while posing as Harper". She pleaded guilty and was sentenced to a year in prison.

In October 2019, she met a French couple who had recently moved to Melbourne. Claiming to be 18 years old and called Sakah, Azzopardi moved into their home to become their au pair under false credentials. In November 2019, she told the parents she was taking the two children on a picnic, but instead took them to a mental health unit in Bendigo, claiming to be a 14-year-old who had been abused by her uncle. After this incident, she was charged with child stealing, theft and property deception, to which she pleaded guilty in May 2021 and received a two-year sentence. During the trial, it was revealed following multiple assessments that she had been diagnosed by Australian forensic psychiatrist Jacqueline Rakov as suffering borderline personality disorder and a rare phenomenon called pseudologia fantastica, which manifests itself in compulsive lying, internally motivated by her fantasies to recreate a happy childhood narrative.

Between August and October 2023, after serving a sentence in New South Wales, she claimed to be a 17 year old Belgian victim of domestic violence named Hattie Leigh. She obtained $20,000 worth of aid from family violence support services. In a Melbourne court on 9 October 2024, she was sentenced to two years imprisonment but is already eligible for parole.

In February 2026 a report claimed that the Parole Board of Victoria refused to confirm or deny whether Azzopardi had been released on Parole. This came in circumstances where she could be released on Parole in October 2025. The report came amidst a possible sighting of Azzopardi in Bowral NSW, not far from her birthplace of Campbelltown, NSW.

On 19 February 2026 a report emerged that Azzopardi had gained parole and was again on the run.

== Media depictions ==
=== The GPO girl ===
In 2019 the podcast ‘Swindled’ did an episode on Samantha.

=== Finding Samantha ===
In 2023, Azzopardi was the subject of a seven-part true crime podcast series Finding Samantha from RTÉ Documentary On One in Ireland. Speaking with victims, police and care workers, the team also contacted Azzopardi. The series reached No. 1 in iTunes and Spotify Ireland, as well as charting in the top 10 podcast charts in numerous other countries.

=== Con Girl ===
In 2023, Azzopardi was the subject of Con Girl, a four-part Australian true crime docuseries that premiered on the Seven Network on 17 September 2023 and released on Paramount+ in the United Kingdom and Ireland on 22 February 2023.

=== Casefile ===
In August 2025, Australian true crime podcast Casefile covered Azzopardi's story in 'Case 323: The GPO Girl'.
