= Disappearance of Rui Pedro Teixeira Mendonça =

Portuguese child who went missing in 1998

Rui Pedro Teixeira Mendonça
- Born: 28 January 1987; Lousada, Portugal
- Disappeared: March 4, 1998 (aged 11); Lousada, Portugal
- Status: Missing for 28 years, 8 months and 15 days; declared dead in absentia in 2019
- Known for: Missing person

Rui Pedro Teixeira Mendonça (born 28 January 1987) is a Portuguese boy who went missing on 4 March 1998 in Lousada, northern Portugal. Mendonça was 11 years old and riding his bicycle outside near his home when he disappeared. The subsequent police investigation was criticized by both the media and by the missing boy's family. Mendonça's whereabouts remain unknown, and he was declared legally dead in 2019.

== History ==
=== Disappearance ===
On 4 March 1998, at around 2:00 PM, Mendonça took his bicycle and cycled to his mother's workplace, located near the family home. He had asked his mother for permission to spend the afternoon riding in a car "with his friend Afonso" (Afonso Dias), a 22-year-old lorry driver. Mendonça's mother denied the request, and told him to go play in an abandoned lot outside her office.

=== Sightings ===
The investigation into the child's disappearance was slow to commence and soon slowed down further due to the lack of credible leads. Nevertheless, the case had sparked public interest to a degree that sightings of Mendonça were numerous over the years since his disappearance. A prostitute, Alcina Dias, confirmed that Afonso Dias had taken Mendonça to see her on the day he disappeared. Afonso allegedly drove up to see her in his car and asked her if she was working. When she assented, he offered to pay her to have sex with Mendonça. Alcina Dias said that Mendonça was extremely nervous and crying by the time he exited the vehicle, reportedly saying that Afonso had forced him to meet her. Alcina Dias added that she tried to calm the boy down and asked him if his mother knew he was there, to which the boy replied no. Mendonça then allegedly drove off in Afonso's vehicle. Alcina Dias allegedly tried to give her deposition to the authorities, but could never identify Afonso Dias by name. In 2011, she finally identified him in a court of law.

In April 1998, the political commentator Nuno Rogeiro traveled to Disneyland Paris with his family. During the trip, the Rogeiro family snapped several photographs whilst on a ride; one of these photos depicts a boy sitting behind the family who reportedly looks remarkably like Mendonça. Sitting next to the boy was a man in his 40s wearing a red jacket. The Portuguese police did confiscate the photographs for further analysis, but no further progress was made regarding this sighting.

On 1 September 1998, 13 police forces raided alleged members of an international Child Sexual Abuse Material ring known as the Wonderland Club. The operation was code-named Operation Cathedral and resulted in the confiscation of 750,000 images and videos depicting 1,263 different children. Mendonça was among the few children (just 16 in total) that could be identified. However, his whereabouts remain unknown. Police suspect that he was murdered by his abductors after being abused on camera for other members of the child sex ring. In Switzerland, a boy was heard saying in a restaurant in 2007: "I was also kidnapped. I'm from Famalicão and for me no one is looking." Police informed the family that the lead was not consistent. It was also highlighted that the boy could have been Rui Pereira, who disappeared two days before Mendonça. In later years, Rui Pereira has been identified in pictures regarding the child sex ring and the worldwide Operation Cathedral movement.

== Investigation ==
Mendonça's tutor called his parents because the child had not turned up for his 5:00 PM lesson, and they quickly initiated a search for him. Mendonça had told his mother that he was planning to meet up with his friend Afonso, who was identified as being Afonso Dias. When brought in by police and questioned, Dias was in an emotional state and simply replied that he did not know the boy's whereabouts, but that the police "should close the borders".

Mendonça's cousin, João André Mendonça, recounted to the police that he, Mendonça and Dias had had a conversation where Dias took them to go meet up with a prostitute. The cousin said he had not joined Mendonça, Dias, or Afonso on that day because his mother would not let him leave the house. The police considered the possibility of kidnapping, slavery, homicide and suicide.

== Trial ==
Dias' trial started in November 2011. Alcina Dias identified him in court.

On 3 October 2014, Dias, was sentenced to three years in jail for the kidnapping of Mendonça during the afternoon of his disappearance. On 18 March 2015, Dias was led to jail by his lawyer, after his arrest warrant had been issued. His sentence was reduced to two years for good behavior. On 29 March 2017, Dias was released.

== Criticism and controversies ==
=== Prosecution ===
Filomena Teixeira said that police did not investigate members of the family, neighbors and Dias' car, which witnesses said they saw Mendonça go into. She also said she was sexually harassed by one of the investigators.

"In the Judiciary Police they were incompetent at first, the case was very badly treated. It was the worst nightmare I could have. I was alone fighting against incompetent people. They even told me that they weren't ready for these kind of things. How is that possible? (...) At the time they didn't do anything. They said [that I couldn't] go to the hills [to look for my son]. They said that they didn't like me."

"[I] went everyday to the police to know if they had done something. I look in their files, everything was on paper and then there were tapes. In the beginning they had computers and they didn't know how to work with computers, because the officers there were old and didn't know how to work with computers."

- Filomena Teixeira, 2019

Teixeira called hospitals, traveled abroad many times, in one of those times she had to be hospitalized after seeing pedophilic material, searching for a lead of a boy in Switzerland. When failures in the investigation were highlighted in court, Teixeira said "it served to prove that I was saying the truth. For 13 years, I got called crazy, and now, after all this time, the come to tell me I was right: after all, I wasn't crazy, I was right. (...) I was said that they were going the wrong way, that they weren't looking, that they weren't doing anything..." Ricardo Sá Fernandes said that "we were shocked with what was said in court today, we were aware since the first moment that the inspectors knew about the prostitute Alcina Dias. They never heard her formally and justified it as forgetfulness." Manuel Mendonça believed that Dias could say something about Mendonça when in jail, since he got to choose and be put in a jail that looked like an "hotel" (when compared to the others).

=== Journalistic opinions and investigations ===
Through the years, Ana Leal's investigative journalism in TVI brought new leads to Mendonça's case, always before the police. She followed leads from the Benidorm video, information from various pedophile photos from Holland and Switzerland. According to the journalist "it only has one explanation: negligence from the many teams of the Judiciary Police (...) There wasn't a political desire (..) They got followed TVI's investigations (...) it was annoying for TVI to be ahead (...) shame to a PJ team."

In two photos presented in the PJ (Judiciary Police) process for a SIC report, the inspector Luís Bordadágua said that it was possible to see resemblances with Mendonça in the archives found with pedophiles. The reconnaissance was hindered due to the boy having his eyes shut in one of the photos. A Public Ministry agent alleged that the leads were fake and the PJ said later that they did not have leads to follow such a line of investigation.

In another photo that Ana Leal had access to in 2002 and gave to the judiciary power, it's possible to see a gagged boy with signs of torture that the family recognized as Mendonça. With the appearance of these leads, Ricardo Sá Fernandes questioned the "worrying social passivity of the authorities of the European Union to destroy the international pedophile ring" and the "lack of capacity for investigation, mainly at a European level". Ana Leal got a hold of the photo from a computer of a pedophile that was killed and questioned the fact that fourteen pedophiles were identified in the series of 60 thousand photos, however the investigations did not move forward. At the time, the suspect was arrested temporarily. When the photo of the supposed Mendonça was presented to the media in October 2002, Sá Fernandes had not been able to access the PJ process for a month. That PJ attitude made the Mendonça family question what was actually happening.

According to an investigation published by the Correio da Manhã in May 2019, the Judiciary Police "uses photos and secrets to deflect false information and photos of Rui Pedro". According to the Portuguese police, forensics proved that it was not Mendonça in the photos. The Benidorm video was not referenced.

When Dias was accused for the first time and much time after the beginning of the process, the journalist Hernâni Carvalho critiqued in many points the State's and police work:

This only has the bad side of justice. It has the bad side of justice that didn't care about this for anything and it has the shameful side of justice that thirteen years later tries to fix it by hand (...) The Maddie [Madeleine McCann] case had governments, armies, firefighters, everyone looking for the [foreign] kid. This one was Portuguese and no one cared about him (...) We should be ashamed of what is happening. (...) When Rui Pedro went missing no one cared about anything and Afonso Dias, when the kid went missing said in front of many people (...) 'if you want to get the kid back close the borders'. They didn't do anything. And everything they did, was done poorly.

(...)

If today you know a lot, or a part of what happened it is because (...) the [journalist] Ana Leal did more for this that a lot of police officers that had that obligation. This is a shame. (...) The Portuguese State should already have taken care of this lady [Filomena Teixeira] that's suffering (...) just because they can't give her an answer, they didn't want to give her an answer.

(...)

There was a prosecutor that asked for an authorization for a prisoner to be freed that guaranteed that he knew where Rui Pedro was. The result: the prisoner went missing. Was not it. It's clear isn't it? They gave the prisoner credit cards. They gave the prisoner a car, gave money and (...) [everything went missing] If that was a lie I would be arrested, because it's easy to arrest journalists, working is hard.

The journalist also critiqued the law for having allowed for Mendonça's grandfather to have the role that the Portuguese State had spending money on the Madeleine McCann case. However, Mendonça's grandfather spent his fortune falling for all kinds of scams while searching for the boy. He also questioned the PJ's high rate of success in solving missing children cases, but this one went through three teams of investigation without success. In another interview, he said that the Portuguese State should be on the defendant's bench in Dias' trial, for having left in the open who was, or were the defendants through the fourteen years, which could have affected the testimony of the witnesses in the court.

=== Afonso Dias ===
In one of the Dias' hearings, it was brought up that the defendant came from a poor family, was 22 and played with an 11 year old child at the time of the disappearance. It was also brought up that the defendant was meeting up with Mendonça in private as Mendonça's parents had forbidden it, after Dias came back changed from the army and as a deserter.

Manuel Mendonça said that he and the neighbors noticed that Dias' financial resources increased after the boy's disappearance and that the first PJ team did not believe the information received from both the prostitute and the family. Dias was an unhygienic person, however in the day of the disappearance he took two baths. When Manuel Mendonça got to the PJ they said it was not possible to extract anything from the suspect's clothes. Manuel Mendonça also said that Dias laughed while talking to Filomena Teixeira. He also said that the defendant's lawyer and family did not want to help to find Mendonça.

The chief-inspector Henrique Noronha said in 2011 that in the reconstitution there was "a hiatus of time that we couldn't figure out (...) We were a bit perplexed [when Afonso Dias said that he] stood in a place looking at nothing and burning the midnight". The inspector also said that he did not understand the reason of not following the lead of Alcina Dias.

Hélder Silva, that was one of the five children that saw Mendonça for the last time, told the Correio da Manhã that Dias "Was very weird. Afonso knew Rui Pedro's whole life, where he was, who he was with, what he would do the next day. In the two weeks prior to the disappearance he created a total obsession with him, he didn't leave him alone". After speaking against Dias, Silva said that he and the other witnesses were scared and did not receive police protection. In 2011, João André Mendonça that when he was giving his testimony in GNR (Republican National Guard) in 1998, Dias asked him to "not open his mouth" and that "the authorities should close the borders (...) Maybe they still have time".

In 2012, Paulo Gomes, Dias' lawyer, declared that "Mister Afonso isn't talking because his freedom is on the line". In the same year Dias said that he was going to talk about what happened with Rui Pedro, but he would do it outside of the courtroom.

In an interview to Grande Revista of RTP in 2012, he said that he does not talk more because of all the help he gave to authorities that only served for his prosecution thirteen years later. When questioned about Rui Pedro he answered after a long silence: "As I see it... I don't know... three weeks after another kid went missing in Famalicão. Either it was a kidnapping or he fell in a well... I don't know". Later (in 2018), he said he did not have a theory on what happened with the boy.

Ricardo Sá Fernandes, Mendonça family's lawyer, stated in 2017: "I keep saying that what I would really like is for Afonso Dias to tell us what happened with Rui Pedro after they left the prostitute. But he didn't say anything in court, and continues to not reveal what I would like for him to reveal. And, I repeat, what I would really like would be for him to say what he knows."

In 2011, Sá Fernandes said that he had a solid accusation, but did not want to turn Dias into a "scapegoat," and in case there was any doubt, he would not ask for his conviction.

"We are sure that the defendant consummated the crime [of kidnapping] (...) doesn't have the slight sign of regret. Acts with total indifference (...) It was proven that the defendant kidnapped Rui Pedro, taking him to Lustosa against the minor's parent's will. (...) I evaluated the evidence and reached the conclusion that the defendant is the author of the facts judged here. I ask for justice and humanity for the case's resolution. In the end of this process there is sorrow and anguish for not finding out what happened to Pedro. The Public Prosecution asks for justice and waits for it to be done" - Public Prosecution, 2012

When Dias' arrest was definitely announced, Manuel Mendonça said that the now convicted had multiple opportunities to tell what he did to Mendonça, even by anonymous letter and highlighted that he did not want his conviction.

After being freed, Dias said in 2018 that he was a victim of "a great injustice" and blamed Mendonça's family for his jail time.

=== Witnesses ===
Afraid of being kidnapped and missing Mendonça, one of the boy's friends at school tried to commit suicide two months after the disappearance. In the crime's reconstitution, Dias could not explain what he did between 14 (2 P.M) and 18 (6 P.M) hours on the day Mendonça disappeared. With the reconstitution it was proven that the investigation let leads and important witnesses slip by. The inspectors did not want to explain to the press the reason why they devalued Alcina Dias' testimony.

A man that worked in a gas station guaranteed that at the time of the disappearance he saw Mendonça, in the centre of the village of Lousada, walking next to two other boys. The court questioned the witness about his statements to the GNR the day following the disappearance, where he said he saw two children passed by on bikes, but that neither was Mendonça. The witness insisted that he could not remember giving the testimony to GNR, even thought his signature was in the records. They also heard a witness that said they saw Mendonça's bicycle at 16 (4 P.M) hours.

Without being identified, a boy that was 14 at the time of the disappearance, told RTP that PJ did not value the different testimonies given to the police. The witness, along with four other young people, was waiting for Mendonça to arrive to play football. When Mendonça got there he said he was not going to play anymore, hid his bike and got in the car.

In 2003, in the Casa Pia Process, a man said that he was with Mendonça in a pension for sexual meetings, in the end of January 2001. He added that the same child appeared in a pornographic movie. It was said the lead is unconsidered for not sustaining itself.

=== Involving the law ===
==== 2002 reconstitution ====
Eduardo Souza that was one of the chief-inspectors of the investigation team of PJ, said in a SIC interview that in the first reconstitution of Mendonça's disappearance that happened in 2002, it was possible to see that Dias was lying:

"That reconstitution was able to show the inconsistencies (...) that Afonso had put himself (...) By nervousness shown, by the path he followed and by the insecurity that he always maintained during the reconstitution. You could perfectly tell that that wasn't true. He was making it up..." - Eduardo Souza

The police investigated, the Prosecution did not accuse. Souza also said that some failures in the process may have occurred and that it wasn't legally defined that his competence was to investigate missing people.

==== Afonso Dias' acquittal ====
"The silence of Afonso Dias made us think of the worse. The only explanation that I find for him to continue to not talk is that he is hiding something even worse than what is being discussed. (...) Afonso has the legal right of being silent, but not the moral right (...) He still has time to regret. We have the remote hope that Afonso Dias comes to his senses as a man and says what happened." - Ricardo Sá Fernandes, 2012

In Dias' trial, the following facts were given as proven by the judge Carla Fraga:

1. In the day of Mendonça's disappearance, a man introduced an 11-year-old boy to the prostitute, Alcina Dias. According to the court's hypothesis, it could have been another man and another boy.
2. Mendonça got in Dias' car and left his bike next to the meeting place.
3. Seven witnesses confirmed that Mendonça had two meetings with Dias.
4. Dias was going to introduce Mendonça and João André Mendonça to the prostitutes. However, the court said it was not proven that Dias had formulated a plan for Mendonça to have sexual relations with the prostitutes.
5. Dias ordered that João André Mendonça did not tell anyone about the invitation that he made to meet with the prostitutes, as he was afraid of "becoming a suspect."

Such proven facts did not avoid the defendant's acquittal in March 2012. Manuel Mendonça questioned the coincidences that the court used to come up with the hypothesis that unlinks Mendonça to Alcina Dias, given that, even if it was another child, it would not be normal for them to be accompanied by a man to meet with a prostitute, and that this event had not been investigated. In court, one of the inspectors of the first investigation team, José Ribeiro dos Santos, questioned the testimonies of Carlos Teixeira and Alcina Dias, even being interrupted multiple times so he would not tell testimonies of people that would later appear as witnesses. Ricardo Sá Fernandes said that the use of testimonies of the inspectors to discredit Alcina Dias in court, was illegal. According to lawyer Fernando Arrobas da Silva, the doubts raised in court were the reason a conviction was avoided in the 2012 trial.

==== João Rouxinhol's lie ====
João Rouxinhol, one of the inspectors of the first investigation team of the PJ stated in court in 2012 that he lied to the press in 2005 when he accused Mendonça's family of having hidden the fact that Mendonça suffered from epilepsy. When questioned by the press about the following statement given in court he said that it doesn't match with a lie:

"When I said it, I said it, the statement not being true. What I said about only knowing in 2005 about the epilepsy is not factually true, I gave that interview thrilled by some revolt that I felt for what was being said against our investigation team."

The inspector received a light punishment of 25 days of suspension, replaced by loss of salary in retirement pension. João Rouxinhol also said that because of "forgetfulness" he did not listen to the witness Alcina Dias. Other crucial witnesses were heard years after the disappearance and by another investigation team. One of them a merchant that said he saw Alcina Dias with a boy.

==== Answers to the investigation's problems ====
In the show Praça da Alegria, of RTP, the judge Rui Rangel was questioned about the thirteen years of investigation for a kidnapping accusation and the lack of its efficiency. The judge answered that the police is efficient, but that it "was needed that the Public Prosecution explains with clarity why it took thirteen years". When questioned by the press, the answer of the Attorney General of the Republic, Pinto Monteiro, was the following: "It probably couldn't take less time (...) I can't follow 550 thousand proceedings, especially one that started nine years before I became Attorney General (...) the investigators, better than anyone, will be able to say (...) the Prosecution doesn't have any comment to make".

==== In camera ====
In 2007, the case was put in camera for a few months.

==== Police investigation ====
After the high-profile case of Madeleine McCann, that garnered attention to the kidnappings of children in Portugal, the Mendonça case received another investigation team. That team had a terrible performance, with Mendonça's family asking for the team's replacement. The leads that connected Mendonça to the international networks of pedophilia were closed in 2011. According to Cândida Almeida, of the Central Department of Investigation and Penal Action (DCIAP), there was not any more evidence and everything of this line of investigation was investigated to "exhaustion". Another reason for the closing of this line of investigation, was that the Public Prosecution considered there were "enough evidence" to accuse Dias. The DCIAP entered the case in September 2003. That new team moves forward, with one of the working theories being that Mendonça accidentally had an epileptic attack while he was with Dias.

In 2019, Hernâni Carvalho interviewed Carlos do Carmo, an old investigation coordinator of PJ in Linha Aberta, of SIC. Carlos do Carmo stated that the case should have been immediately have been declared as a kidnapping, because the child followed a routine when he disappeared. He added that the bicycle and the place where it was found in the day of the disappearance should have been examined, which did not happen since it was a missing person case. They looked for Mendonça's bicycle, but they did not find it.

Carlos do Carmo said he did not know the reason why Dias had said: "If you want Rui Pedro close the borders". Hernâni Carvalho ended the interview by telling Carlos do Carmo:

"I would like to leave this enigma: by curiosity, by paradox or by pure coincidence, two days before Rui Pedro disappeared (...) an eleven year old boy disappeared (...) no one found out anything about him either"

Júlia Pinheiro questioned Francisco Moita Flores in 2011 about the police not having connected the fact that Afonso Dias had ties to Holland. Moita Flores agreed that it was a path that should have been followed. It was also questioned the fact Dias' financial life was not investigated and that during the reconstitution, the camera stopped recording the event, without it being noticed.

Manuel Mendonça said that the police "joked around" with the case for three or four years, without recording things, gathering samples or DNA tests, always thinking that Mendonça would come back because he was playing or had run from home.

=== Police corruption accusation ===
In 2007, a representative of Innocence en Danger, a global NGO launched in 1999 to combat pedophilia, at the time with international offices in Germany, France and the United States, said that "the corrupt police [of Portugal] don't care" about the problem, and cited as an example the cases of Mendonça and Madeleine McCann. After three years, the NGO gave up trying to open an office in Portugal, saying that they were pressured by local authorities.

=== Institutions ===
According to an evaluation by Helena Machado, investigator at the University of Minho, that has investigated this field, "The Rui Pedro case didn't mobilize the investigative police's resources that were used in the Madeleine McCann case. And much less captured the attention or involvement of Government members, as in the case of the British girl (...) [Adding the lack of contacts with power ties] all the necessary ingredients to captivate the media and audience weren't met, it contained all the ingredients to be an exceptionally noticeable criminal narrative".

According to Dulce Rocha, president of the Child Support Institute, "The Rui Pedro case was a landmark, it sparked a bigger sensitivity to cases like this one". For Patrícia Cipriano, president of the Portuguese Association of Missing Children, "The police had the humility of owning that there flaws in the past, which is of great importance to change mentalities of those who investigate and the procedures used (...) There is a more sensitized, committed and careful attitude from the authorities (...) there are still cops that persist in the error of informing the missing child's parents that they can only accept the report 48 hours after the disappearance (...) [An attitude that is] inadmissible, wrong and irresponsible".

== Repercussion ==
=== Institution ===
Filomena Teixeira launched in 2007 an association for missing children, the Association of Family Members of Portuguese Missing Children. At the inauguration was Laurinda Meira, the mother of Rui Pereira, who disappeared in Famalicão, also in 1998. Two thousand children were also present.

=== In the media ===
In 2007 the first website for Mendonça was created. In the same year, Mendonça was listed in the "Eight Portuguese Cases", of the newspaper Diário de Notícias, with cases of children that disappeared and remain unsolved. On Mendonça's 16th anniversary, Filomena Teixeira wrote a letter to her missing son. The letter was available on social media and in the Diário de Notícias. On Mendonça's 27th anniversary, a video was released on January 28, 2014 that became popular on social media. The actors Paulo Pires and Ana Padrão, among other people participated. In January 2020, Teixeira also wrote a second letter, this time for the 33rd birthday.

An update to the PJ's website made it that Mendonça was taken out of the online missing people list for a few hours in August 2017.

=== Films and documentaries ===
In 2005, the Mendonça was adapted and released in the movie "Alice", directed by Marco Martins. It was the winner of the Regards Jeunes award in the Cannes Festival in 2005. In 2019, Mendonça was mentioned in the Netflix documentary, The Disappearance of Madeline McCann. In June 2019, the production of a movie inspired in Mendonça and other missing children was announced, Sombra - Uma Mãe Sabe (Shadow - A Mom Knows). It was also announced that the recording would start in September and would end in November 2019. The script was written by Bruno Gascon. The movie Patrick (2019), directed by Gonçalo Waddington was also compared with the Mendonça case.

=== Books ===
- Levaram-me (They Took Me), written by Paulo Pereira Cristóvão

== See also ==
- Disappearance of Madeleine McCann
- Disappearance of Johnny Gosch
- List of people who disappeared mysteriously: post-1970
