= Death of Matthew Leveson =

2007 death in New South Wales, Australia

Matthew Leveson
- Born: Matthew John Leveson; 12 December 1986
- Died: 23 September 2007 (aged 20)
- Parent(s): Mark Leveson; Faye Leveson

Matthew John Leveson (12 December 1986 – 23 September 2007) was an Australian man who was last seen leaving a Sydney nightclub on 23 September 2007. He was reported missing by his family after he failed to show up to work. On 27 September, his car was found dumped at Waratah Park Reserve in Sutherland; evidence suggested he did not park it there and police believed he had "met with foul play". In August 2008, Leveson's boyfriend, Michael Atkins, was arrested and charged with murder. In October 2009, Atkins was acquitted of murder and an alternative charge of manslaughter, following a four-week trial.

In November 2016, the New South Wales Attorney General agreed to an immunity deal with Atkins, which protected him from perjury in exchange for leading police to Leveson's remains. The search began on 10 November, but was called off on 17 November, after no leads were found. Police resumed searching on 25 May 2017 and discovered Leveson's remains on 31 May. An inquest into his death delivered an open finding on 5 December, with the deputy state coroner stating there was insufficient evidence to determine how or why Leveson died.

== Disappearance ==
Leveson was at Arq nightclub in Darlinghurst, in the early morning of 23 September 2007, with close friends and his boyfriend, 45-year-old Michael Peter Atkins. He was last seen on CCTV leaving the club at around 2 am with Atkins. Atkins returned to Arq about an hour later without Leveson. At 3:20 am, Leveson sent a text message to a friend saying, "Mike's having a fucking cry, he is taking me home and won't let me stay! Fucking cunt!" A minute later, he sent another message: "He needs to fucking get over himself". Later that day, at 12:20 pm, CCTV cameras captured Atkins buying a mattock and duct tape at Bunnings in Taren Point.

On 25 September, Leveson's parents, Mark and Faye, reported their son missing after he failed to show up to work. On 27 September, Leveson's car, a green 1999 Toyota Corolla hatchback, was found abandoned outside of a public toilet at Waratah Park Reserve in Sutherland, a known gay beat. A Bunnings receipt with Atkins's fingerprints on it was found in the boot. A speaker system had also been removed from the boot; it was later found in the garage area of the unit Atkins shared with Leveson. Police did not believe Leveson parked his car there, based on evidence found, and suspected foul play.

== Investigation ==
=== Arrest and trial ===
On 5 August 2008, Atkins was arrested at his apartment in Cronulla and charged with murder.

On 3 September 2009, Atkins's trial began in the Supreme Court of New South Wales. On 20 October, the jury found Atkins not guilty of murder and an alternative charge of manslaughter.

=== Search for and discovery of remains ===
On most weekends since 2008, Mark and Faye searched the Royal National Park with picks and shovels in search of their son's remains. Their starting point was where Leveson's car was found. They searched at around 2 am looking for suitable places and would return in the daytime to "search properly".

In November 2016, Gabrielle Upton, the Attorney General of New South Wales, agreed to an immunity deal with Atkins, which protected him from "being charged with perjury if he showed police where the body was". The specific terms of the deal were "no body, no deal". On 10 November, police began a large-scale search of the Royal National Park using information provided by Atkins, but no remains were found and the search was called off on 17 November. Another search was undertaken in January 2017, but no remains were found. On 25 May 2017, police resumed the search and on 31 May, skeletal remains were uncovered beneath a cabbage-tree palm. DNA testing confirmed that they belonged to Leveson. The Levesons took the tree and planted it in their backyard.

== Inquest ==
On 5 December 2017, the deputy state coroner, Elaine Truscott, delivered an open finding at the inquest of Leveson's death. There was insufficient evidence to "positively determine — to the requisite standard — how or why Matt died". Leveson's father Mark said, "There's some relief, there's some frustration, there's some anger, so there's lots of emotions going through us but relief's one of the ones right now".
