= Death of Keith Warren =

1986 suicide by hanging in Maryland

Keith Warren was a 19-year-old African-American teenager who was found hanging from a tree in Silver Spring, Maryland, in 1986.

On Tuesday, July 29th, 1986, Keith received a call from friends and went to hang out with them but never returned home. The next day, July 30th, 1986, his mother, Mary Couey, called the Montgomery County Police to report him missing. The police informed her that unless he was an invalid or on medication, she would have to wait 48 hours to file a report.

July 31st, 1986, at approximately 2:00PM a woman called paramedics at the nearby Fire and Rescue Station to report a suicide. They arrived at Chip Wynn's house, where they found out his girlfriend, Michelle Lawson had called it in. They were directed to the nearby woods, where they found the body of Keith Warren hanging from a tree. Officer Luther Leverette responded to the scene, where his death was almost immediately ruled a suicide.

Police had the body taken down and delivered to the funeral home to be embalmed. The family was notified about 6 hours after the discovery of his body.

On April 9th, 1992, Mary found an envelope with no return address at her door, containing police photos of her son's crime scene. It is still unknown who sent these photos or how they got them. She had noticed that the items of clothing that she received from the police were not the same ones in the photos.

His death was still ruled a suicide by police. In the following decades, Warren's family and various advocates highlighted what they felt were failures in the police's investigation and called for the case to be reopened. Mary, his mother, started The Keith Warren Justice Foundation and continued doing her investigations into her son's death until she passed in 2009. Now, Keith's sister, Sherri Warren, keeps the foundation going.

Warren's case was the subject of the 2022 docuseries, Uprooted.
