= All Things Vice =

Blog by journalist about the dark web

- Company type: Private
- Website type: Blog
- Available in: English
- Founded: 2012; 14 years ago
- Headquarters: Melbourne, Australia
- Owner: Eileen Ormsby
- Founder: Eileen Ormsby
- Services: Investigative reporting
- Website: allthingsvice.com
- Current status: Active

All Things Vice is a blog that was started in 2012 by Australian author and journalist Eileen Ormsby about news in the dark web. Since her investigations into the darknet marketplace Silk Road in 2012, she blogged about various happenings in the dark web and authored two books, Silk Road (2014) and The Darkest Web (2018).

== About the founder ==
Ormsby is a former Australian lawyer living in Melbourne. Sought for comment, Ormsby has written, been interviewed and cited on dark web, 419 scams, bitcoin and darknet market issues. She has obtained a number of exclusive interviews from individuals involved in the dark web. She was cited in the trial of drug dealer Paul Leslie Howard that he discovered the Silk Road market after reading the coverage on her site. She also regularly writes scripts for Casefile True Crime Podcast, including some about the dark web.

Ormsby is known as an authority on Silk Road and other darknet markets and her work has been cited in academic studies into cyryptomarkets and political and socioeconomic aspects of the dark web.

== In the media ==
Ormsby has appeared on and consulted to TV shows and documentaries about the dark web, including CBS 48 Hours "Click for a Killer" (2018), Channel 4 UK's "How to Hire a Hitman" and Oxygen TV's "The Dark Web: Fraud and Murder in the Digital Underground." She was also interviewed on episode 124 of the podcast "Meet the Thriller Author" discussing her investigations and writing true crime books.
