= Sven Å. Christianson =

Swedish psychologist and writer

Sven Åke Christianson (born 18 June 1954) is a Swedish professor of psychology. He is also a psychologist and writer. His research primarily concerns the function of human memory, crime and mental trauma and interview methods. He is widely discredited and his methods are considered pseudoscientific and unreliable.

== Career ==
Christianson undertook his doctorate at Umeå University in 1984, became associate professor in 1987 and was awarded the title of professor in 1996 at Stockholm University. In addition to his current position at the Stockholm University, he has served at Umeå University, the University Hospital of Umeå, the Montreal Neurological Institute in Montreal, Canada, and the University of Washington in Seattle, USA. Christianson has published over 100 research articles in scientific journals.

Periodically, he has also worked outside the universities to implement knowledge about memory and interview techniques. Examples of such institutions are the Swedish Police Authority in Stockholm County, the forensic region clinic in Sundsvall and for Correctional Officers at the Institution Norrtälje, a closed prison for prisoners deemed dangerous.

Christianson's views on the perpetrators of serious sexual and violent offenses, traumatic experiences in children and adults, as well as cognitive interview methodology has gained considerable influence in several investigations and lawsuits. He is perhaps best known for being interviewed as an expert in media coverage of the investigations of a shooting murder in Rödeby, the sex offender Atheer as-Suhairy (the "Alexandra Man"), and the death in 1998 of 4-year-old Kevin Hjalmarsson, as well as the trials of murderer Christine Schürrer, child sex offender Tito Beltrán and Thomas Quick (later overturned as a miscarriage of justice).

He was also involved in the interrogation of the suspected murderer Matija Sovdat in 1998.

== Controversies ==
His involvement in the case against Thomas Quick is controversial, and it has also been noted that he was one of the psychologists in the circuit around the therapist Margit Norell.

Regarding the death of Kevin Hjalmarsson where Christianson was the key psychologist involved, Swedish newspaper Dagens Nyheter has reviewed the process and argue that his recommendations were not in line with good practice and may have influenced the investigation unduly.

== Published works ==
- Amnesia and Emotional Arousal (1984)
- Handbook of emotion and memory: Research and theory (1992, ed.)
- Traumatiska minnen [Traumatic memories] (1994, 1996, 2002, 2009)
- Rättspsykologi [Right Psychology] (1996, ed.)
- Brott och minne [Crimes and Memory] (1996, 2002, along with Görel Wentz)
- Avancerad förhörs- och intervjumetodik [Advanced interrogations and interview methodology] (1998, together with Elisabet Engelberg and Ulf Holmberg)
- Polispsykologi [Police Psychology] (2004, ed. together with Pär Anders Granhag
- Offenders' memories of violent crimes (2007, ed.)
- Handbok i rättspsykologi [Handbook of Forensic Psychology] (2008, ed. together with Pär Anders Granhag)
- I huvudet på en seriemördare [In the mind of a serial killer], Norstedts, Stockholmn 2010, ISBN 978-91-1-302556-8
- Psykologi och bevisvärdering [Psychology and evaluation of evidence] (2011, together with Marika Ehrenkrona)
- "Jag kände mig speciell" – Grooming på Internet ["I felt special" – Grooming on the Internet] (2012, together with Ulrika Rogland)
