= Murder of Simone Strobel =

Murder of backpacker in Australia

Simone Strobel
- Died: 11-12 February 2005; Lismore, New South Wales, Australia
- Occupation: Kindergarten teacher
- Known for: Murder victim

Simone Monika Strobel (c.1979 – c.11/12 February 2005) was a 25-year-old German kindergarten teacher and backpacker whose body was found at a sportsground in Lismore, New South Wales, six days after being reported missing from the caravan park where she had been staying. An initial inquest in 2007 found insufficient evidence to lay charges over her death.

== Murder ==
Prior to her murder, Strobel—a German national from Würzburg, Bavaria—had been backpacking through Australia with her boyfriend, Tobias Suckfuell, Suckfuell's sister, Katrin, and their friend, Jens Martin. On 11 February 2005, the group checked in to the Lismore Tourist Caravan Park. That evening, they spent the night drinking at the Gollan Hotel, before being ejected at 11:10pm by the bar manager. The group returned to the caravan park to continue their evening.

The following morning at about 10:00am, Suckfuell and Martin reported Strobel missing at the Lismore Police Station, telling the police that she had left the campsite during the night after an argument had broken out between the Suckfuell siblings. The police subsequently put out a public appeal for information and carried out an extensive search.

Strobel's nude body was discovered on 17 February 2005 by the NSW Dog Unit on a bocce court less than 100 metres from the campsite where she had disappeared, covered by palm fronds. Her cause of death is unconfirmed. A second coronial inquest was held between 11–15 November 2024, and formal findings were delivered on 6 November 2025. The NSW State Coroner concluded "I am unable to find, as Coroner MacMahon did, that the most likely cause of death was suffocation or smothering asphyxia. I accept the submissions that no cause of death can be determined on the available evidence". The Coroner concluded that "Simone Simone died in the vicinity of the Continental Music, Sports and Recreation Club in Lismore, New South Wales, Australia". This overturned the previous Coroner's decision who concluded Simone had died within the vicinity of the Caravan Park. The Coroner also concluded that it was unlikely that Katrin, Jens and Tobias were involved in Simone's death, but would not exclude them entirely stating, "I do not, however, accept that the evidence before me supports a finding by me that it is very unlikely Mr Moran was involved in Simone's death." [paragraph 250 of the Coroner's Findings on 6 November 2025 - Coroners Court Lidcombe]. The Coroner however did conclude that Simone's killer/s likely had a sexual motive, stating "Combining the fact that Simone was found naked with the circumstantial evidence regarding violent crime in the area where her body was found, together with the expert pathological evidence that cannot rule out sexual assault, I accept the submissions that it is likely Simone’s killer had a sexual motive. I also accept, on balance, that it is probable her clothes were removed for a sexual motive before her body was pushed through the wire fence and concealed under palm fronds." [paragraph 242 of the Coroner's Findings on 6 November 2025 - Coroners Court Lidcombe].

== Investigation ==
On 14 February 2005, three days before Simone's body had been found, Detective Sergeant Diehm commenced Strike Force HOWEA, to investigate her disappearance. Following the discovery of Strobel's body on 17 February 2005, the Richmond Police District sought the assistance from the Würzburg Criminal Police and the Würzburg Prosecutor's Office to investigate her murder.

A coronial inquest into Strobel's death was held in 2007, with State Coroner Paul McMahon presiding. Upon legal advice, both Tobias and Katrin Suckfuell declined to testify, while Jens Martin returned to Australia to give evidence. Ultimately, McMahon ruled that there was insufficient evidence to lay charges for the murder.

In 2014, Detective Sergeant Shane Diehm pleaded guilty to a number of charges including lying to the Police Integrity Commission and drug taking, and was removed from the NSW Police force. Detective Sergeant David Mackie took over as lead of Strike force HOWEA.

In 2014, the Bavarian Office of Criminal Investigation announced a €10,000 reward for information leading to an arrest or conviction. In addition, on 15 October 2020, the New South Wales Government and police announced a $1 million reward.

A second coronial inquest was held between 11–15 November 2024, and formal findings were delivered on 6 November 2025. The Coroner concluded that Simone's killer/s likely had a sexual motive, stating "Combining the fact that Simone was found naked with the circumstantial evidence regarding violent crime in the area where her body was found, together with the expert pathological evidence that cannot rule out sexual assault, I accept the submissions that it is likely Simone’s killer had a sexual motive. I also accept, on balance, that it is probable her clothes were removed for a sexual motive before her body was pushed through the wire fence and concealed under palm fronds." [paragraph 242 of the Coroner's Findings on 6 November 2025 - Coroners Court Lidcombe]. The Coroner has referred the case back to the Unsolved Homicide Team for assessment monitoring and further investigation (paragraph 310 of Coroner's findings).

== Arrest ==
In July 2022, Tobias Moran (formerly Tobias Suckfuell) was arrested by former WA Police officer Cameron Blaine, along with Strike Force Howea detectives in Western Australia, in connection with Strobel's murder. He appeared before Perth Magistrates' court on 26 July 2022 and remanded in custody pending extradition to New South Wales, where he will face court in Sydney. Upon his extradition, Moran was charged with murder and attempting to pervert the course of justice. Lead investigators claimed that further arrest warrants had been issued in Germany for Katrin Suckfuell and Jens Martin, in relation to allegations of being accessories after the fact, however German Prosecutors denied this was true.

The charges against Tobias Moran were due to be certified in the Lismore Local Court on 14 June 2023 but the court was told the Office of the Director of Public Prosecutions (DPP) had decided not to proceed and the charges were withdrawn due to their being no reasonable or probable cause for the charges. Mr Moran was awarded costs.

== Media ==
Strobel's murder was the subject of the book "Have You Seen Simone?" by Virginia Peters who carried out her own investigation into Simone's death with the help of Lismore detective former Detective Sergeant Shane Diehm, Detective Sergeant David Mackie, and Chief Inspector Wayne Hayes New South Wales most experienced homicide detective at that time. In 2014, Moran sued unsuccessfully for an injunction to prevent its publication, and subsequently sued both Peters and the book's publisher, Schwarz Publishing, for defamation. The proceedings were settled and dismissed in 2017 with Moran ordered to pay Peters' costs in the sum of $120,000. [Orders of Justice Kenneth Martin, Supreme Court of Western Australia 25 May 2017)

Initial forensic testing following the crime in 2005 did not identify usable DNA on the palm fronds, with any biological material understood to have been degraded by environmental exposure. Subsequent advances in mitochondrial DNA (mtDNA) testing produced results where Mr Moran and Ms Suckfüell could not be excluded as contributors. It was falsely reported in Peters’ 2014 book that the DNA 'matched' the Suckfuell sequence and that "all the mtDNA at the body disposal site had been accounted for". Later expert analysis identified apparent high levels of contamination and an inability to distinguish between contamination and potential crime-scene contribution, and further testing, including complete genomic sequencing undertaken in 2021–2022, ultimately found that the sample was not consistent with either individual. The NSW State Coroner in 2025 confirmed that the mtDNA from the palm fronds did not match Mr Moran or Ms Suckfüell. [Coroner’s Findings, 6 November 2025, paras 142–145]. Multiple unknown mtDNA was found within the crime scene and also an unknown male DNA was found on the top Simone was wearing the night she was killed [para 299, Coroner's Findings, 6 November 2025].
