= Operation Cathedral =

Police operation against an online paedophile network

Operation Cathedral was a police operation that broke up a major international child pornography ring called The Wonderland Club operating over the Internet. It was led by the British National Crime Squad in cooperation with 1,500 officers from 13 other police forces around the world, who simultaneously arrested 104 suspects in 13 countries (including Australia, Belgium, Finland, France, Germany, Italy, Sweden, the UK, and the US) on 2 September 1998. The case received widespread international attention due to the highly organised nature of the ring, leading to public concerns of online child sexual abuse and legislative changes in the UK.

== Overview ==
The Wonderland Club, (also officially known as w0nderland) named after Alice in Wonderland, was described as "an international network of paedophiles involving the rape of boys and girls live on camera and the traffic in images of the torture of children as young as two months". It was created in 1995 by two American paedophiles, including one named Peter Giordano, and existed in an Internet Relay Chat with an encryption system created initially by the former KGB. The investigation had been sparked by a tip-off from US police investigating the 1996 rape of an 8-year-old girl broadcast live to paedophiles by webcam. The accused, Ronald Riva of Greenfield, California, was in a pedophile gang called The Orchid Club and was encouraged during the assault by six others, including Ian Baldock, a member of Wonderland.

One reason for the high profile of the operation was the unusually high number of images possessed, produced, and distributed by Wonderland members (more than 750,000 images and 1,800 videos). One requirement for entry to the club, apart from a recommendation from an existing member, was the expectation to supply 10,000 new or self-produced pornographic images of children. Despite substantial police work, only 17 of the 1,263 children appearing in the images have been identified: one from Argentina, one from Chile, one from Portugal, six from the United Kingdom, and seven from the United States. The Portuguese national was later identified as Rui Pedro Teixeira Mendonça, an 11-year-old boy kidnapped in Lousada on 4 March 1998 and whose whereabouts are currently unknown.

Six members of the club committed suicide after the raids. Other raids related to the Cathedral operation include 1999's Operation Queensland, involving 20 police forces, and 2001's Operation Janitress, which included police forces across 12 regions.

== British members ==
The following is a list of British citizens arrested as a result of Operation Cathedral, and their ages when convicted:

- Ahmed Ali, 31, taxi driver, nicknamed "Caesar". Jailed for two years.
- Ian Baldock, 31, computer consultant. Jailed for two-and-a-half years. Released in 2002, he reoffended again 2 years later and was arrested for possession of indecent images of children and sentenced to 4 years.
- Andrew Barlow, 25, computer consultant, nicknamed "Mix". Jailed for two years.
- Stephen Ellis, 40, computer salesman. Heavily encrypted his computer files. Committed suicide in January 1999 prior to the trial.
- David Hines, 30, unemployed, nicknamed "Mutt's Nutts", who later discussed the club publicly on Panorama. Jailed for two-and-a-half years.
- Gary Salt, taxi driver, former engineer, nicknamed "Jazz" and "chairman" of the club. Assisted the Cathedral sting by providing his login details. In 1998, he was sentenced to 12 years for sex offences. Released from prison in 2010 (having changed his name to Anthony Andrews) he was re-arrested months later when caught viewing indecent images on a computer in Old Trafford Library.
- Gavin Seagers, 29, computer consultant and Sea Cadets youth leader. Jailed for two years. Arrested and sentenced again in 2011 for a similar offence as Gavin Smith.
- Antoni Skinner, 36, computer consultant, nicknamed "Uhura" and "Satan". Jailed for 18 months.
- Frederick Stephens, 46, taxi driver, nicknamed "Guess Who" and "Me Again". Jailed for a year.

== Legal changes ==
On 13 February 2001, seven British members of Wonderland were sentenced at the same court hearing at Kingston upon Thames Crown Court. At this time, however, the maximum sentence for the particular crimes in the UK was three years, leading to the UK-based perpetrators only being sentenced between 12 and 30 months for their crimes. Protests by child care campaigners led to proposed legal revisions of British laws and an increase in penalties to 10 years as per the Sexual Offences Act 2003.
