= Casefile =

Australian true crime podcast

- Genre: True crime
- Language: English

Cast and voices
- Hosted by: Anonymous host

Music
- Theme music composed by: Mike Migas, Andrew Joslyn

Production
- Production: Mike Migas

Technical specifications
- Audio format: Podcast

Publication
- No. of episodes: 336 cases (387 episodes)
- Original release: 9 January 2016
- Provider: iTunes, Google Podcasts, SoundCloud
- License: Commercial

Related
- Website: casefilepodcast.com

Casefile is an Australian crime podcast that first aired in January 2016 and is hosted by an Australian man who remains anonymous. The podcast, produced by Casefile True Crime Podcast, is usually released on a Saturday for three consecutive weeks, with a bonus episode on the fourth week. The series deals with solved or cold criminal cases, often related to well-known murders and serial crimes. Unlike a number of similar podcasts, the series is fully scripted and narrated, while relying primarily on original police or mass-media documents, eyewitness accounts, and interview or public announcement recordings.

Many early episodes relate to Australian cases (e.g., Port Arthur or the Snowtown murders), although notable crimes from the UK and the US were increasingly featured, and well-known cases from other countries have also been included. Larger and more-complex cases have received multiple-week serialised broadcasts, and case updates to previously aired cases are also provided from time to time. The series has been well received, and has won a number of awards since its debut.

== Production ==
Casefile first aired on 9 January 2016 and was conceived by an anonymous Australian host who started producing the show in 2015 in his spare room. According to several sources, the host remains anonymous because he wanted the show to focus primarily on the stories, facts, and the questions raised. The host had been interested in podcasts since about 2008/2009 when he was first introduced to the concept. Around 2015, he had just had surgery and was listening to a lot of podcasts and true-crime shows (e.g. The Joe Rogan Experience, Hardcore History, Serial, and Making A Murderer) at the time, and felt encouraged by Joe Rogan to make his own, and was inspired by Dan Carlin's in-depth research and narrative storytelling style. By the end of 2017, he was working on the show full time.

In its format as at mid-2026, the Casefile team consists of the host/narrator, a producer/composer, a sound editor, and four researcher/writers (and producers for the Portuguese and Polish versions). It has also had its producer/composer, Mike Megas, "since about episode 7", which led to the first six episodes being reworked. Researchers have also travelled internationally to access primary resources in some cases, such as the show's first researcher and co-writer Anna Priestland who joined around episode 30. Since 2018, a number of cases have also been written and researched by creative director Millie Raso and some by author Eileen Ormsby.

== Episodes ==
Most episodes remain publicly available once released. One episode, Case 55 (Simone Strobel, released 15 July 2017), was removed due to legal issues, although general details of the podcast itself are still publicly available. Others (Cases 19 (Snowtown, released 14 May 2016) and 30 (The Claremont Serial Killer, released 20 August 2016)) have been temporarily removed with the intention of eventually updating and/or improving them. More recently, some of the earlier episodes have also been updated, reworked, and re-released as Casefile Archives.

== Reception ==
Along with the recent rise in true crime podcasting, as seen in series such as Serial or S-Town, the show was reviewed positively by several sources. One early review focussed on the differences to similar shows noticeable in the production, such as its sombre music and limited host editorialising, while also avoiding the use of primary materials by simply replaying news clips, emergency calls, and interviews. Other reviewers have commented on the strengths of the show's research, on its extensive reviewing of people and places in their cultural context, and on its impact on the genre. In contrast, factors such as the lack of host transparency, the length and detail of some episodes or series, and the lack of variety of format have been regarded as criticisms.

In Australia, the podcast has consistently been in the top 10 since May 2016. By episode 99, the show was appearing in the podcast charts in 107 different countries. Download statistics by iTunesChart.net show that Casefile had charted in the top 100 in 5 regions, with peak ranking positions including: Australia (2), Canada (9), Germany (68), United Kingdom (11), and United States (7). Overall, as of July 2019, individual episodes have been downloaded more than 275 million times. As of 2022, it was still being downloaded over 2 million times a month and had been downloaded over 600 million times by August 2023. As of February 2025, it was still being listened to by more than 800,000 people a month. The US and Australia remain the shows main audiences (with 35% listener share each) and women representing arount 70% of all listeners.

== Awards ==
Since 2016, the show has received numerous awards:

- Apple Podcasts (Best of 2016–2023)
- CastAway 2017 Australian Podcast Awards
- Discover Pods award (Most Innovative Podcast 2017)
- Off the Charts 2017
- Spotify Podcasts of the Decade

== Related content ==
Each case includes a corresponding page on the Casefile Presents official homepage, which details information such as special thank-yous, official support phone numbers, and websites (for Australia, the UK, the US, Canada and New Zealand), other credits, and resources (such as books, websites, videos, documents, articles, maps, wanted posters, and suspect sketches). Warnings are regularly given at the start of podcasts due to the graphic content. It is available via numerous sites. Since 2018, a companion YouTube channel also offers the show's episodes.

Early in the show's history, updates to cases were also occasionally aired as breakthroughs or other significant events occurred. However, as the podcast evolved, these began to be placed behind a voluntary subscription paywall. In July 2019, it was announced that these updates would now be spun out into an informal companion series, From the Files, to be aired monthly in the show's off week. To replace it, a new patron only show called Behind the Files debuted the same month. It was announced in December 2019, however, that From the Files would be put on hiatus for 2020. In September 2023, it was announced that a new companion podcast "loosely based" on From the Files called Unfiltered would be starting, hosted by Raquel O'Brien.

Casefile Presents also produces and releases a number of crime podcasts besides Casefile including: The Vanishing of Vivienne Cameron (2020) – covered in episode 80; Searching For Sarah MacDiarmid (2021); The Detective’s Dilemma (2022); Matty (2022); The Frankston Murders (2023)- covered in episode 23; and, Dragonfly (2023). Since 2020, a Portuguese version of the show, known as Casefile True Crime – Edição Oficial em Português, is also produced. In February 2025, a Polish version, Casefile Polska, was also launched.

In August 2022, an official card-based boardgame (similar in play to Cluedo) was released by Goliath Games, a Dutch game manufacturer. Titled Casefile: Truth & Deception Board Game players, acting as private detectives, try to solve the murder mystery of a businessman. In 2024, a second game was released in the US market called Casefile: Temptation & Trickery Game.

== See also ==
- Criminal (podcast)
- List of Australian podcasts
