= List of Australian films of 2003 =

Title	Director	Cast	Genre	Notes
About Face	David Knijnenburg	Liddy Clark, David Knijnenburg, Muriel Watson, Christopher Walker, Peter Rasmussen, John Dommett	Short	
Ain't Got No Jazz	Joel Kohn		Short	
Alexandra's Project	Rolf de Heer	Gary Sweet, Helen Buday, Bogdan Koca	Thriller	
Alice	Garth Davis	Asher Keddie, Anthony Hayes, Tony Nikolapoulos	Short drama	
Alone across Australia	Ian Darling, Jon Muir	Jon Muir	Documentary	
Astray	Michelle Warner	Eva White, Damien Garvey	Short drama	
At the Edge of the Bed	Mark Lee	Tony Martin, Belinda Giblin, Patrick Trumper	Short drama	
Baby	Simon Lyndon	Milo Balcic, Milenko Pavlov, Jovana Petrovic, Dina Prelevic	Short comedy	
Bad Eggs	Tony Martin	Mick Molloy, Bob Franklin, Judith Lucy	Comedy	
The Ball	Anny Slater	Max Gillies, Gabby Millgate	Short	
The Bathers	Elissa Down		Short	
Black	Jake Kennedy		Short / Horror	
Blank Point	Henry Inglis	Fiona Cornelisse, Trevor Everett, Rona Lewis, Sebastian Rossetti, Cyril Toman	Short	
Black Swan	Aaron McCann		Short/Fantasy/Crime (14min)	Won/Nom. 2004 West Australian Screen Awards
Bloody Homos	Robbie Baldwin		Short comedy	
Bob Kennedy: L'homme qui voulait changer l'Amérique	Patrick Jeudy		(Documentary (52min)	Won 2004 Avignon Film Festival Best Film
Boys Will Be Boys	Russell Smith		Short/Drama/Comedy	
Broken				
Brothers				
Budgie				
Bush Bikes				
Ca-Chi-Pun				
Calling Gerry Molloy				
Car Park				
Carlton + Godard = Cinema				
The Cherry Orchard				
The Child in Me				
Children of Tibet				
Clutch				
Cogs and Quills				
Cold Turkey				
A Cold Summer	Paul Middleditch			
Collier Brothers Syndrome				
Contact	Kieran Galvin		Short	
Cracker Bag	Glendyn Ivin	Edith Cattell, Damon Kaine, Pauline Keeley	Short drama	
Crash Test				
Creative Violence	Paul Dowie	Michael King, Hamish McLean, Brett Swain, Monica Karwan, Geire Kami, Lawrence Mooney		
Damn Right I'm a Cowboy				
Damo				
Danny Deckchair	Jeff Balsmeyer	Rhys Ifans, Miranda Otto	Comedy	
Darkwater				
Deluge				
Desperate Man Blues				
The Diamond Cutter				
Don't				
Dope				
Drag My Feat				
Energi: Calm				
Entombed	Dalibor Backovic		Short/Horror	
The Evil Within				
Excursion				
Fish Sauce Breath				
The Flaming Brain				
The Finished People				
Floodhouse	Miro Bilbrough		Drama	
Forbidden				
The Forest				
Fuel				
Fugue				
The Garth Method				
Gettin' Square	Jonathan Teplitzky	Sam Worthington, David Wenham, Timothy Spall		
A Girl a Horse a Dream				
Glory				
Good Luck Jeffrey Brown				
Harvie Krumpet	Adam Elliott	Geoffrey Rush, Julie Forsyth	Animation	
Heartworm				
Hello				
The Honourable Wally Norman	Ted Emery	Kevin Harrington, Shaun Micallef	Comedy	
Horseplay				
The House of Names				
Iced Lolly				
Inheritance: A Fisherman's Story				
In My Image				
Intersex Exposition: Full Monty				
In the Cut	Jane Campion			
In the Realm of the Hackers	Kevin Anderson		Documentary	
Inspector Gadget 2	Alex Zamm	French Stewart, Elaine Hendrix, D. L. Hughley		
Inversion				
Japanese Story	Sue Brooks	Toni Collette		Screened at the 2003 Cannes Film Festival, AACTA Award for Best Film
Kink				
The Kitchen				
L' Envie				
La Quimera de los héroes				
Lennie Cahill Shoots Through				
Lesbo-A-Go-Go				
Let the Boys Play				
Liquid Bridge				
The Long Lunch				
Long Shadows: Stories from a Jewish Home				
The Longing				
Losing Face				
Lost Things				
Love Tricycle				
Lovesick				
Magnificent Deed				
The Man on the Boat				
Martha's New Coat				
MAX: A Cautionary Tale	Nicholas Verso	Amber Clayton	Coming of age / thriller	
Max's Dreaming				
Meatball				
Milkmen				
Missing Pieces				
Mittens				
Molly & Mobarak	Tom Zubrycki		Documentary	
The Moment After				
The Mormon Conquest				
Mother Tongue				
My Family Is Special				
My Small Italian Shotgun Wedding				
The Navigators: Baudin vs Flinders				
Ned	Abe Forsythe	Felix Williamson, Abe Forsythe, Damon Herriman, Josef Ber, Jeremy Sims, Caitlin McDougall, Drew Forsythe, Michala Banas, Ryan Johnson, Michael Falzon, Nathaniel Dean, Scott Major, Grant Bowler, John Batchelor, Cornelia Frances, Angela Keep, Emma Lung, Michael Park, Jason Donovan		
Ned Kelly	Gregor Jordan	Heath Ledger, Orlando Bloom, Geoffrey Rush, Naomi Watts	Biopic	
Newman				
The Night We Called It a Day	Paul Goldman	Dennis Hopper, Melanie Griffith	Drama	
Nightclubber				
No Regrets				
Painting with Light in a Dark World				
Paradise Found				
Phantom Ham				
Photograph				
Piece of Cake				
The Policy				
The Postcard Bandit	Tony Tilse	Tom Long, Brett Stiller	Crime	
Preservation				
Press Any Button				
Primary Love				
Prisoner Queen	Timothy Spanos	Jude Kuring, Tim Burns, Matt Thomas, Michael Burkett	Drama Comedy	
Pristine Books				
Queen of Hearts				
Rag 'n Bone Man				
The Rage in Placid Lake	Tony McNamara	Ben Lee, Rose Byrne, Garry McDonald, Miranda Richardson		
Razor Eaters				
The Referees				
Rendezvous				
Return to Port Davey				
Rockdale '83				
The Rouseabout				
Salomon				
Scoff				
Shanti				
Shit Skin				
A Short Portrait of Zora Zakowski				
Silent Storm				
Sister Pearls and Mission Girls				
The Situation Room				
Sniffer				
So Close to Home				
A Spoonful of Desi				
Spoonman				
Subterano				
Sweetheart				
Sweetness and Light				
Swerve It Like Merv				
Swimming Upstream	Russell Mulcahy	Geoffrey Rush, Judy Davis		
Syntax Error				
Take Away	Marc Gracie	Vince Colosimo, Rose Byrne	Comedy	
Tango Walk				
Teesh and Trude	Melaine Rodriga	Susie Porter, Linda Cropper, Peter Phelps		
Telos				
Teratoma				
Test Drive				
Test Irregular				
The 13th House				
Three Card Monte				
Time of Death				
Travelling Light				
Travellers and Magicians				
The Tub				
Tuck and Cover				
Turn Around				
Two White Lines				
Undead				
Victim	Corrie Jones	Rebecca Davis as The Victim	Short drama	
Violet Lives Upstairs	Ben Hackworth	Rebecca Frith as Violet	Short (18min)	Won 2003, Film Critics Circle of Australia Awards for Best Short
Visitors	Richard Franklin		Drama/Horror/Thriller	3 International Noms
Wâhori Days				
Waiting for Naval Base Lilly	Zak Hilditch		Drama	
The Waltz	David Deneen		Short drama	
The Wannabes				
Ward 13	Peter Cornwell		Short animation	
Watermark	Georgina Willis		Crime / Drama	
Why We Ponder	Nathan Hunt		Short drama	
Wildness				
You Can't Stop the Murders	Anthony Mir	Anthony Mir, Gary Eck		

== See also ==
- 2003 in Australia
- 2003 in Australian television
- List of 2003 box office number-one films in Australia
