= 2003 in Australia =

- Monarch: Elizabeth II
- Governor-General: Peter Hollingworth, then Sir Guy Green, then Michael Jeffery
- Prime minister: John Howard
- Population: 19,872,646
- Elections: NSW

The following lists events that happened during 2003 in Australia.

- Decades: 1980s; 1990s; 2000s; 2010s; 2020s
- See also: 2003 in Australian television; 2003 in Australian literature; Other events of 2003; Timeline of Australian history

== Incumbents ==
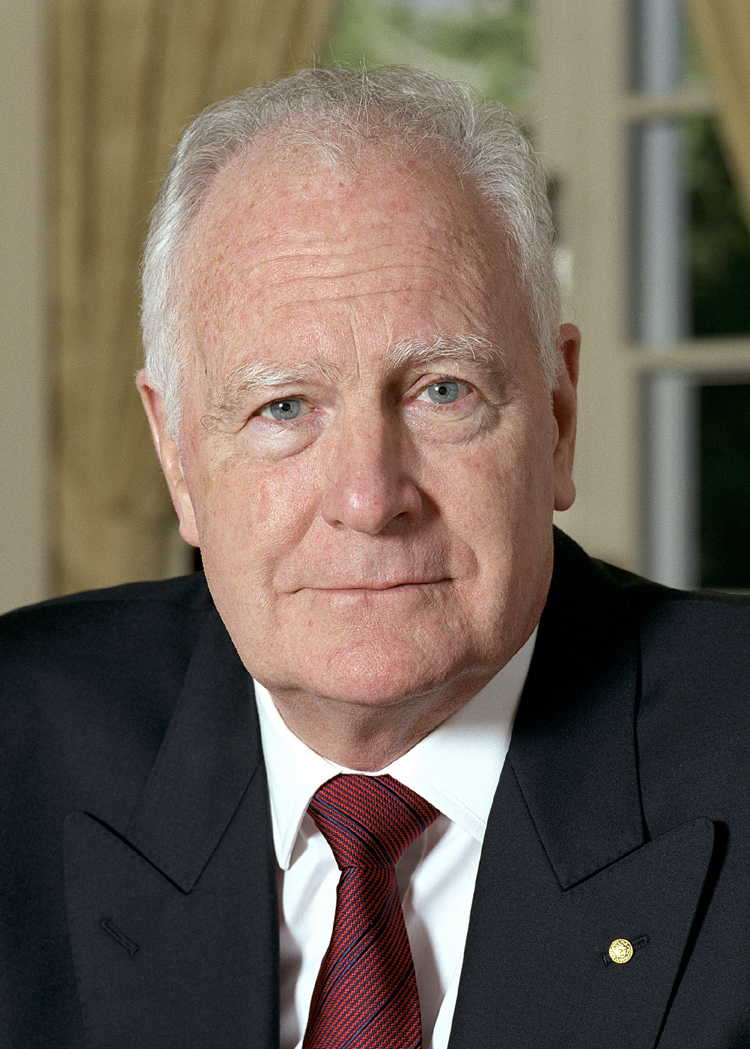
Peter Hollingworth

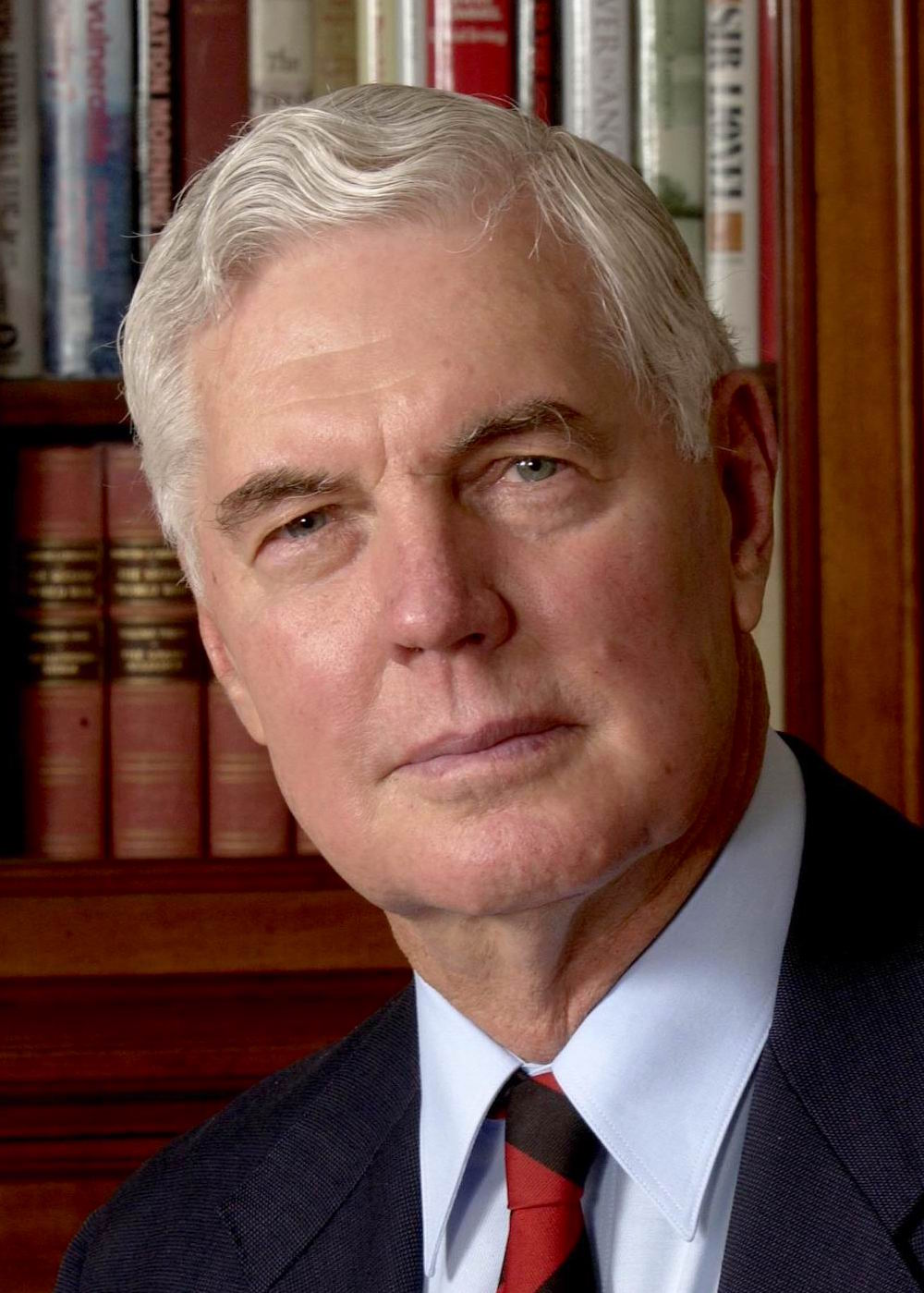
Michael Jeffery

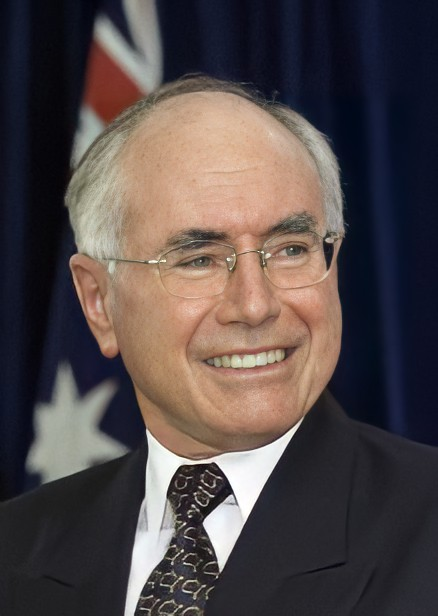
John Howard

- Monarch – Elizabeth II
- Governor-General – Peter Hollingworth (until 28 May), then Michael Jeffery (from 11 August)
  - Administrator of the Commonwealth – Sir Guy Green (from 28 May to 11 August)
- Prime Minister – John Howard
  - Deputy Prime Minister – John Anderson
  - Opposition Leader – Simon Crean (until 2 December), then Mark Latham
- Chief Justice – Murray Gleeson

=== State and territory leaders ===
- Premier of New South Wales – Bob Carr
  - Opposition Leader – John Brogden
- Premier of Queensland – Peter Beattie
  - Opposition Leader – Mike Horan (until 4 February), then Lawrence Springborg
- Premier of South Australia – Mike Rann
  - Opposition Leader – Rob Kerin
- Premier of Tasmania – Jim Bacon
  - Opposition Leader – Rene Hidding
- Premier of Victoria – Steve Bracks
  - Opposition Leader – Robert Doyle
- Premier of Western Australia – Geoff Gallop
  - Opposition Leader – Colin Barnett
- Chief Minister of the Australian Capital Territory – Jon Stanhope
  - Opposition Leader – Brendan Smyth
- Chief Minister of the Northern Territory – Clare Martin
  - Opposition Leader – Denis Burke (until 14 November), then Terry Mills
- Chief Minister of Norfolk Island – Geoffrey Gardner

=== Governors and administrators ===
- Governor of New South Wales – Marie Bashir
- Governor of Queensland – Peter Arnison (until 29 July), then Quentin Bryce
- Governor of South Australia – Marjorie Jackson-Nelson
- Governor of Tasmania – Sir Guy Green (until 3 October), then Richard Butler
- Governor of Victoria – John Landy
- Governor of Western Australia – John Sanderson
- Administrator of the Australian Indian Ocean Territories – Bill Taylor (until 30 July), then Evan Williams (from 1 November)
- Administrator of Norfolk Island – Tony Messner (until 30 July), then Michael Stephens (until 1 November), then Grant Tambling
- Administrator of the Northern Territory – John Anictomatis (until 30 October), then Ted Egan

== Events ==
=== January ===
- 9 January - Convicted child sex offender Dennis Ferguson is released from jail amid public outcry in Queensland after serving a 14-year sentence.
- 17 January - Batsman Darren Lehmann made a racist outburst during Australia's four-wicket victory at the Gabba. Lehmann shouted "black c-" while entering the dressing room after being run out.
- 18 January – Four people die in the Canberra bushfires of 2003.
- 31 January – Seven people die in the Waterfall train disaster, which happened due to the driver having a heart attack at the controls of the train & losing control of the train.

=== February ===
- 2–6 February - Cyclone Beni causes widespread flooding and damage in south-east Queensland, but also easing the drought in rural areas. Floodwaters claimed the life of a 67-year-old man on 5 February as he attempted to rescue a horse trapped in floodwaters near Rockhampton.
- 4 February - Mike Horan is voted out by the National Party as Leader of the Opposition in Queensland and is replaced by Lawrence Springborg.
- 11 February - Justice John Dyson Heydon is sworn in as judge of the High Court of Australia, replacing Justice Mary Gaudron.
- 16 February – Tens of thousands of Australian protestors join millions more in other cities around the world in the 2003 anti-war protests demonstrating against the Iraq War. These are the biggest street protests seen since the Vietnam War.
- 22 February - Cricketer Shane Warne is suspended from cricket for one year from 10 February 2003.
- 26 February - Victorian MP and former Olympic skier, Kirstie Marshall, is ejected from her first question time when she breastfed her newborn baby in Victoria's Parliament, the first woman to do so.

=== March ===
- 10 March - Quentin Bryce is announced as the next Governor of Queensland.
- 20 March – The Iraq war begins. Australia sends 2000 military personnel to the conflict.
- 22 March – Bob Carr's ALP government is re-elected for a third term in New South Wales

=== April ===
- April – The North Korean freighter Pong Su is stormed by Special Operations Command troops carrying almost 125 kg (300 lb) of heroin.
- 11 April - Natasha Ryan is found hiding in a wardrobe at her 26-year-old boyfriend's home near Rockhampton. Leonard John Fraser was acquitted of her murder.
- 22 April - Max Sica reports finding the bodies of the three Singh children in the spa of their family home at Bridgeman Downs. He was later convicted of their murders on 3 July 2012.
- 28 April – All Pan Pharmaceuticals products are recalled by the Therapeutic Goods Administration after a number of safety problems were found at its manufacturing plant, in what was one of Australia's biggest ever recalls.

=== May ===
- 14 May - Shirley and Vijay Singh ask police to remove Max Sica from their children's funeral service.
- 25 May - Peter Hollingworth bows to pressure and quits as Governor-General following Anglican church child sex scandal.
- 29 May – An attempted hijacking of Qantas Flight 1737 between Melbourne and Launceston is thwarted when a flight attendant and passengers subdue and disarm the culprit.
- 30 May - Finding Nemo was released and it takes place in Great Barrier Reef and Sydney Australia
  - Stockbroker Rene Rivkin is fined $30,000 and sentenced to nine months of periodic detention for insider trading. A jury found that he had acted improperly in buying 50,000 Qantas shares in April 2001 just hours after hearing of a potential merger between the company and the struggling Impulse Airlines.

=== June ===
- 4 June - Queensland Chief Magistrate Di Fingleton is sent to jail for six months after a Supreme Court jury found that she has unlawfully retaliated against a witness.
- 5 June - The Federal Court rules in Commissioner of Taxation v La Rosa that a convicted heroin dealer is entitled to a tax deduction of $220,000 for money stolen from him during a drug deal.
- 22 June – Major-General Michael Jeffrey becomes Australia's Governor-General after the resignation of Dr Peter Hollingworth due to his handling of a child sex case while he was Anglican Archbishop of Brisbane.

=== July ===
- 3 July - Australian film critic, Margaret Pomeranz, attempted in Sydney to screen the controversial movie Ken Park, which had been refused classification and banned by the Classification Review Board on the grounds that the film depicted actual child sex abuse.
- 10 July - News South Wales' Independent Commission Against Corruption issued findings against a member of the Legislative Council, Malcolm Jones, of the Outdoor Recreation Party. The ICAC found Mr Jones had misused taxpayer dollars, by falsely claiming an allowance for living in the country, as well as using entitlements to prop up other political parties.
- 11 July - Pop singer Delta Goodrem announces that she has been diagnosed with Hodgkin's disease, a rare form of cancer.
- 19 July - The Australian Government committed 2,500 troops to the Solomon Islands for a Regional Assistance Mission in an effort to help the government re-establish law and order. The troops arrived on 24 July.

=== August ===
- 10 August - Brisbane's Festival Hall closes its doors for the last time.
- 11 August - Major-General Michael Jeffrey is sworn in as Australia's Governor-General.
- 20 August -
  - Former One Nation leader, Pauline Hanson, and David Ettridge are sentenced to three years jail for electoral fraud.
  - Saudi Arabia rejects a shipment of 58,000 sheep from the MV Cormo Express on alleged disease grounds and refuses to unload them. The live trade to Saudi Arabia is suspended in light of the rejection.
- 23 August - Prime Minister, John Howard, commits an extra $125 million to help save the Murray Darling River System.
- 25 August - Prime Minister, John Howard, receives a hero's welcome from Solomon Islanders when he visits Honiara.
- 29 August - Ali Abdulrazak was shot 10 times after prayers at the Lakemba Mosque in Sydney, New South Wales.

=== September ===
- 1 September - Former One Nation leader, Pauline Hanson, and David Ettridge are refused bail.
- 3 September - Radical cleric Abu Bakar Bashir sentenced to four years jail after being found guilty of participating in a campaign of treason against Indonesia. He was also convicted for his involvement in the 2002 Bali bombings.
- 10 September - Imam Samudra is found guilty for his involvement in the 2002 Bali bombings.
- 25 September - Gina Rinehart, daughter of mining magnate Lang Hancock, and Rose Porteous, his widow, decide to end their long-running legal battle.
- 29 September - Prime Minister John Howard announces a major ministerial reshuffle. Philip Ruddock becomes Attorney-General, Amanda Vanstone became Immigration Minister and Tony Abbott became Health Minister.
- 30 September - The body of 69-year-old former charity shop worker Marea Yann is discovered at her home in Healesville, Victoria. An extensive murder investigation ensues but the case remains unsolved.

=== October ===
- 3 October - Pop starlet and Neighbours actress Holly Valance loses a NSW Supreme Court legal battle with her former manager, Scott Michaelson, who had sued Valance for dumping him as manager last year. Mr. Justice Clifford Einstein awards more than $330,000 plus legal costs to Michaelson on 6 October.
- 12 October - Australia commemorates the first anniversary of the 2002 Bali bombings.
- 14 October - Three gunmen, one using an automatic weapon, fired indiscriminately into 5 Lawford Street, Greenacre, Sydney, killing 22-year-old Mervat Hanka, asleep in her bed, and 24-year-old Ziad Abdulrazak, who'd been to jail for drug offences.
- 22 October – U.S. President George W. Bush & Chinese President Hu Jintao visits Australia simultaneously. U.S. President Bush gives his address to Australian Parliament on 22 October, while the PRC leader gives his address on 23 October.
- 24 October - Agriculture Minister, Warren Truss, announced that the 50,000 sheep from the Cormo Express, stranded in the Persian Gulf 79 days after leaving Australia, have been accepted by the Government of Eritrea.
- 26 October - ASIO raids the Sydney homes of six suspected terror suspects, including that of 35-year-old Frenchman Willie Brigitte.
- 30 October -
  - Ahmad Fahda, 25, was executed in a hail of gunfire in front of horrified onlookers at the service station on the corner of Punchbowl Road and Dudley Street, Punchbowl, Sydney, New South Wales.
  - The Federal Government's Telstra privatisation bill fails to pass the Senate.

=== November ===
- 6 November - The Queensland Court of Appeal sets aside the convictions of Pauline Hanson and David Ettridge.
- 11 November - Turkish Kurd asylum seekers who landed on Melville Island last week are sent to Indonesia amid a cloud of political controversy.
- 14 November - The Queensland Crime and Misconduct Committee resolved that it would investigate the imprisonment of Pauline Hanson and David Ettridge.
- 20 November - A shipment of 70,000 sheep bound for the Middle East was delayed when Victorian authorities found shredded ham placed into the sheep's feed. Activists declared they'd put pig meat into the feed in an attempt to stop the live sheep from meeting the criteria for Muslim markets.
- 28 November – Simon Crean resigns as Opposition Leader. Mark Latham defeats Kim Beazley by two votes in a party room ballot on 2 December.

=== December ===
- 3 December - Former Queensland Chief Magistrate Di Fingleton walks free from jail after six months.
- 8 December - The Federal Government announces a budget surplus.
- 16 December - The Federal Government made its long-awaited announcement on the excise rate for fuel alternatives after their final Cabinet meeting for the year. LPG for cars, previously free of excise, will be taxed by 2.5 cents per litre from mid-2008.
- 17 December - Health Minister, Tony Abbott, unveils the Government's medical indemnity insurance package.
- 18 December - The Productivity Commission's draft report on housing affordability for first homebuyers is released and puts forward measures including the scrapping of stamp duties, as well as the means testing of the $7,000 First Home Owners Grant. The Productivity Commission concedes there's no quick fix for the big jump in house prices over the last few years.

== Arts and literature ==
- ARIA Music Awards of 2003
- Alex Miller's novel Journey to the Stone Country wins the Miles Franklin Award

== Film ==
- 30 June – Star Wars: Episode III – Revenge of the Sith begins principal photography at Fox Studios Australia in Sydney.
- Kangaroo Jack
- Ned Kelly

== Television ==
- October – After protests from the Vietnamese community, SBS decides to cancel its broadcasts of the state-run news service from Vietnam.
- 31 December – Southern Cross Ten goes on air as a supplementary broadcaster to existing solus broadcaster Central GTS/BKN in the Spencer Gulf region of South Australia and the Broken Hill area of New South Wales.

== Sport ==
- 11 February - Australian cricketer Shane Warne tested positive to a banned substance and the Australian Cricket Board announced that it had referred the matter to the Anti-Doping Policy Committee. Warne announced that he was standing down from Australia's World Cup campaign.
- 12 February – Australia beat England 3–1 in a friendly upset at Boleyn Ground, London.
- 3 April – First day of the Australian Track & Field Championships for the 2002–2003 season, which are held at the ANZ Stadium in Brisbane, Queensland. The 5,000 metres were conducted at the Melbourne Track Classic, Victoria on Saturday 1 March 2003. The 10,000 metres (men and women) were conducted at the Runaway Bay Grand Prix in Queensland on Saturday 12 April 2003.
- 6 April – Sydney Kings win their first championship by defeating Perth Wildcats 117–101 in Game 2 of the last best-of-three NBL Grand Final series.
- 7 April – The Crawford Report delivers recommendations to the Federal Government regarding the Structure, Governance and Management of Soccer in Australia.
- 1 June – Perth Glory avenge their defeat in the 2001–2002 NSL Grand Final by beating Olympic Sharks 2–0 in the Final at Subiaco Oval to become Champions for the first time in their history.
- 10 August: On a rainswept Arena Joondalup, East Perth score only 0.9 (9) against deadly rivals West Perth, the first goalless score in WAFL/WANFL/Westar Rules football since West Perth themselves kicked 0.10 (10) against soon-to-be-defunct Midland Junction in May 1916.
- 7 September – Following the conclusion of the final main round of the 2003 NRL season, the Penrith Panthers win the minor premiership, while the South Sydney Rabbitohs finish in last position, claiming the wooden spoon.
- 12 September – The Melbourne Phoenix defeat the Sydney Swifts 47–44 in the Commonwealth Bank Trophy netball grand final.
- 14 September – Paul Arthur wins the men's national marathon title, clocking 2:31:28 in Sydney, while Helen Tolhurst claims the women's title in 2:58:58.
- 27 September – The Brisbane Lions (20.14.134) defeat the Collingwood Magpies (12.12.84) to win the 107th VFL/AFL premiership. It is the third consecutive grand final win for Brisbane and the second consecutive year that they and Collingwood have met in the grand final.
- 5 October – The 2003 NRL grand final is won by the Penrith Panthers, who defeated the Sydney Roosters 18-6 to win their second premiership and their first since 1991.
- 10 October – 22 November – Australia hosts the 2003 Rugby World Cup. In the final held at Telstra Stadium in Sydney, England defeats Australia 20-17 after a last-minute field goal from Jonny Wilkinson in extra time.
- 12 October – New Zealander Greg Murphy and Rick Kelly dominate the Bob Jane T-marts Bathurst 1000 for the K-mart Racing Team. It was Murphy's third win, each for different teams, while at just 20 years of age, Kelly becomes the youngest winner in the races history. It was the fifth consecutive win for Holden, a new record.
- 4 November – Makybe Diva wins the Melbourne Cup horse racing event. It is the first of three Melbourne Cup wins for the mare.

== Births ==
- 1 December – Robert Irwin, television personality and wildlife photographer

== Deaths ==
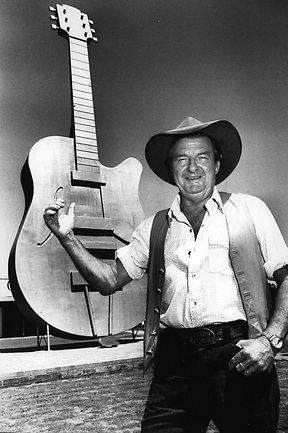
Slim Dusty

- 12 January – Maurice Gibb, musician (born in the United Kingdom and died in the United States) (b. 1949)
- 20 January – John Halfpenny, trade unionist (b. 1935)
- 29 January – Sir Alan Walker, theologian (b. 1911)
- 2 March – Malcolm Williamson, composer (died in the United Kingdom) (b. 1931)
- 3 March – Dick Garrard, Olympic wrestler (b. 1911)
- 7 August – Charlie Jones, New South Wales politician (b. 1917)
- 23 August – Jack Dyer, Australian rules footballer (Richmond) (b. 1913)
- 24 August – Mal Colston, Queensland politician (b. 1938)
- 9 September – Don Willesee, Western Australian politician (b. 1916)
- 19 September – Slim Dusty, country singer (b. 1927)
- 22 September – Bethany Lee, actress (b. 1952)
- 27 September – Olive Cotton, photographer (b. 1911)
- 12 October – Jim Cairns, 4th Deputy Prime Minister of Australia (b. 1914)
- 17 December – Ed Devereaux, actor (died in the United Kingdom) (b. 1925)
- 30 December – Nora Heysen, artist (b. 1911)

== See also ==
- 2003 in Australian television
- List of Australian films of 2003
