= 2003 in Australian television =

== Events ==
- 10 February – 5 years since the last show, Ray Martin returns to the hosting role on Nine's A Current Affair.
- 1 March – Before the Game premieres on Network Ten and was hosted by Dave Hughes and Peter Helliar.
- 17 March – Seven launches a new news bulletin at 4:30 pm, titled Target Iraq, detailing the latest developments on the war in Iraq. After the invasion concludes, the bulletin is retained and is renamed Seven 4.30 News (later Seven Afternoon News), with production moving to Melbourne before it is moved back to Sydney in 2006, where it remains as of today.
- 19 April – Rove McManus wins the 2003 TV WEEK Gold Logie.
- 21 April –
  - Yu-Gi-Oh! premieres on Network Ten as part of Cheez TV.
  - The British episode of Who Wants to Be a Millionaire? in which Charles Ingram cheats his way to the top prize is shown on the Nine Network to an Australian television audience of nearly two million people.
- 4 June – Mike London quits as National Nine News Brisbane weekend co-anchor after he allegedly arranged for a female fan to complain about the presenting style of then-weeknight presenter Bruce Paige.
- 23 June – The Price Is Right is revived on the Nine Network at 5.30pm weeknights, after 5 years off the air. Larry Emdur returns as host and Shawn Cosgrove comes back as the voiceover, earlier news reports had speculated that former A*mazing host James Sherry would be the star, but it never happened.
- 25 June – Neighbours producers has announced that Delta Goodrem, who plays Nina Tucker, will not renew her contract with the Network Ten series when it expires in next month. She is expected to be seen on-air until September.
- 30 June – Network Ten axes vintage episode reruns of Neighbours earlier through the 1991 series after bad ratings. In 2002 Neighbours rated 70,000 viewers during the whole 1990 series.
- 30 June – Two of the ABC's digital television service channels ABC Kids and Fly TV closed down due to funding cuts from the Federal Government.
- 1 July –
  - TEN launches the one-hour afternoon news bulletin instead.
  - Huey's Cooking Adventures moves to the 3:30 pm timeslot on Network Ten with Iain Hewitson.
- 13 July – The Australian version of the Endemol-hit decision making game: Deal or No Deal, premieres on the Seven Network hosted by Weekend Sunrise host Andrew O'Keefe, offering a top prize of a staggering two million dollars before lowering the top prize to $200,000 next year.
- 21 July – Regina Bird wins season 3 of Big Brother, becoming the show's first female winner.
- 23 July – CSI: Miami a sequel to the American mystery fiction television series in the CSI franchise, premieres on the Nine Network and is shown every Wednesday at 8:30pm, followed by American police procedural series Without a Trace at 9:30pm which also debuts on Nine on the same day.
- 27 July – The Australian version of Pop Idol (known as Australian Idol) debuts on Network Ten.
- 28 September – Shaun Faulkner wins the fourth season of The Mole, taking home $104,000 in prize money. Petrina Edge is revealed as the Mole, and Nathan Beves is the runner-up.
- 3 October – Hi-5 airs its 200th episode.
- 10 October –
  - After protests from the community during the Vietnam War, SBS TV has chosen to cancel its broadcasts of the state-run news service across Vietnam.
- 23 October – Axed Neighbours actress Delta Goodrem wins the GOLD ARIA for Single of the Year at the 2003 ARIA Awards, along with six trophies. In addition, John Farnham is inducted to the Hall of Fame.
- 19 November – The first series of Australian Idol was won by Guy Sebastian, defeating Shannon Noll. His first single, Angels Brought Me Here, debuted at number one on the ARIA Top 50 singles. It would reach four-time platinum, while Sebastian's album Just as I Am also debuted at number one and would reach six-times Platinum. In 2010, Angels Brought Me Here would rank as number one on the ARIA end of decade singles chart.
- 24 November - Release date of Guy Sebastian's debut single, "Angels Brought Me Here".
- 26 November – The final episode of Burgo's Catch Phrase goes to air on the Nine Network after a four-year run then a two-year run.
- 5 December – After six years of reading the news together, Ross Symonds and Ann Sanders present their final newscast as presenters of Seven News Sydney. Ian Ross replaced them as of the following Monday. Symonds subsequently retired from the network, while Sanders remains with Seven to this day, reading the national morning news and the local Sydney afternoon news.
- 22 December – Australian children's comedy series The Ferals returns to air on ABC. Rather than airing in the afternoons on Mondays at 5:00pm, the series now airs at 11:20am weekday mornings.
- December – Nine Network takes a new record, as the network wins all forty weeks of ratings.

== Debuts ==
Program	Channel	Debut date
Welcher & Welcher	ABC	6 February
Skithouse	Network Ten	9 February
Ocean Star	Network Ten	10 February
Comedy Inc.	Nine Network	19 February
Your Life on the Lawn	Seven Network	February
After the Game	Network Ten	1 March
Pirate Islands	Network Ten	3 March
Enough Rope	ABC	19 March
Greeks on the Roof	Seven Network	1 May
Micallef Tonight	Nine Network	12 May
Big Bite	Seven Network	8 May
The Block	Nine Network	1 June
The Price Is Right	Nine Network	23 June
Deal or No Deal (2003 series)	Seven Network	13 July
Australian Idol	Network Ten	27 July
CrashBurn	Network Ten	23 August
Merrick and Rosso Unplanned	Nine Network	3 September
So Fresh TV	Nine Network	6 September
Snobs	Nine Network	29 September
Inside Australia	SBS	12 October
Seaside Hotel	Seven Network	18 October
Marking Time	ABC	9 November
The Sleepover Club	Nine Network	12 November
Surfing the Menu	ABC	2003

=== New international programming ===
Program	Network	Debut date
(United States) The Lionhearts	Seven Network	25 January
(United States) Kim Possible	Seven Network	1 February
(United States) Adventures from the Book of Virtues	Seven Network	1 February
(United Kingdom) Fimbles	ABC TV, ABC Kids (digital only)	3 February
(United Kingdom) Yoko! Jakamoko! Toto!	ABC TV, ABC Kids (digital only)	24 February
(United States) Lizzie McGuire	ABC TV, ABC Kids (digital only)	20 March
(United States) God, the Devil and Bob	Seven Network	24 March
(Canada) The Save-Ums!	ABC TV, ABC Kids (digital only)	2003
(United Kingdom) The Life of Mammals	ABC TV	26 March
(France) Mamemo	ABC TV, ABC Kids (digital only)	18 April
(Japan) Yu-Gi-Oh!	Network Ten	21 April
(Japan) Digimon Frontier	Network Ten	21 April
(Canada) Girlstuff/Boystuff	ABC TV, ABC Kids (digital only)	3 June
(France) Martin Morning	ABC TV, ABC Kids (digital only)	3 June
(France) / (United Kingdom) Corneil & Bernie	ABC TV, ABC Kids (digital only)	3 June
(Denmark) The Fairytaler	ABC TV, ABC Kids (digital only)	9 June
(United States) Lloyd in Space	Seven Network	28 June
(United States) Teenage Mutant Ninja Turtles (2003)	Network Ten	4 July
(United Kingdom) Lavender Castle	ABC TV	17 July
(United States) CSI: Miami	Nine Network	23 July
(United States) Without a Trace	Nine Network	23 July
(United States) Teamo Supremo	Seven Network	26 July
(United States) Transformers: Armada	Network Ten	9 August
(United Kingdom) Rubbadubbers	ABC TV	11 August
(France) / (United States) Gadget & the Gadgetinis	Network Ten	15 August
(France) / (United Kingdom) Jasper the Penguin	ABC TV	25 August
(Canada) King	ABC TV	3 September
(United Kingdom) Red Cap	ABC TV	19 September
(United States) Static Shock	Nine Network	20 September
(Japan) Beyblade V-Force	Network Ten	22 September
(Japan) Crush Gear Turbo	Network Ten	26 September
(United States) Siegfried & Roy: Masters of the Impossible	Nine Network	28 September
(Canada) / (Australia) Yakkity Yak	Network Ten	28 September
(United States) Queer Eye for the Straight Guy	Network Ten	29 September
(United Kingdom) The Koala Brothers	ABC TV	8 October
(Japan) Iron Chef	SBS	13 October
(United States) Samurai Jack	Nine Network	16 October
(United States) Justice League Unlimited	Nine Network	17 October
(United States) What's New, Scooby-Doo?	Nine Network	19 October
(United States) Good Morning America	Nine Network	3 November
(United Kingdom) / (Canada) Rotten Ralph	ABC TV	3 November
(United States) The Wire	Nine Network	18 November
(United Kingdom) Murder Investigation Team	ABC TV	25 November
(United States) The O.C.	Nine Network	4 December
(United States) Strawberry Shortcake	Network Ten	6 December
(United States) / (United Kingdom) The Paz Show	ABC TV	2003
(Canada) Roboroach	Network Ten	19 December
(United Kingdom) Little Robots	ABC TV	2003
(United Kingdom) Little Wolf's Book of Badness	ABC TV	24 December
(Canada) Yvon of the Yukon	Seven Network	2003
(United States) Poochini's Yard	Seven Network	2003
(Canada) / (France) Inuk	ABC Kids (digital only)	3 February
(United States) Hack	Network Ten	2003
(United States) Less than Perfect	Seven Network	2003

=== Changes to network affiliation ===
This is a list of programs which made their premiere on an Australian television network that had previously premiered on another Australian television network. The networks involved in the switch of allegiances are predominantly both free-to-air networks or both subscription television networks. Programs that have their free-to-air/subscription television premiere, after previously premiering on the opposite platform (free-to air to subscription/subscription to free-to air) are not included. In some cases, programs may still air on the original television network. This occurs predominantly with programs shared between subscription television networks.

==== International ====
Program	New network(s)	Previous network(s)	Date
(United Kingdom) Eddy and the Bear	ABC TV	ABC Kids (digital only)	17 April
(United States) The Charlie Brown and Snoopy Show	ABC TV, ABC Kids (digital only)	Nine Network	28 April
(Japan) Speed Racer	ABC Kids (digital only)	ABC TV, Seven Network, Network Ten	7 April
(United States) Batfink	ABC Kids (digital only), ABC TV	Network Ten	9 June (ABC Kids), 15 September (ABC TV)
(Canada) / (France) Babar	ABC TV	ABC Kids (digital only)	8 December
(United States) / (Canada) The Magic School Bus	ABC TV	ABC Kids (digital only)	2003
(France) / (Canada) The Adventures of Tintin	ABC Kids (digital only)	ABC TV	2003
(Canada) / (France) / (Belgium) Billy the Cat	ABC TV	ABC Kids (digital only)	2003

=== Subscription television ===
==== Domestic ====
Program	Channel	Debut date
Islandares	Nickelodeon	7 February
Saturday Nick Television	Nickelodeon	2003

==== International ====
Program	Channel	Debut date
(United Kingdom) Bruiser	UKTV	4 January
(United Kingdom) World of Pub	UKTV	1 February
(United Kingdom) Roger Roger	UKTV	25 February
(United States) Punk'd	MTV	1 July
(United Kingdom) Chalk	UKTV	19 July
(United States) That's So Raven	Disney Channel	18 August
(United States) Baby Looney Tunes	Cartoon Network	1 September
(United States) / (Canada) Galidor: Defenders of the Outer Dimension	Fox Kids	2003
(Japan) Hamtaro	Cartoon Network	2003
(United States) / (Mexico) / (Canada) / (Australia) ¡Mucha Lucha!	Cartoon Network	2003

=== Free-to-air premieres ===
This is a list of programs which made their premiere on Australian free-to-air television that had previously premiered on Australian subscription television. Programs may still air on the original subscription television network.

==== International ====
Program	Free-to-air network	Subscription network	Date
(United States) Jackass	Network Ten	MTV	5 February

=== Subscription premieres ===
This is a list of programs which made their premiere on Australian subscription television that had previously premiered on Australian free-to-air television. Programs may still air on the original free-to-air television network.

==== Domestic ====
Program	Subscription network	Free-to-air network	Date
Outriders	Nickelodeon	Nine Network	28 January
Hi-5	Nickelodeon	Nine Network	Q4

==== International ====
Program	Subscription network	Free-to-air network	Date
(Canada) Degrassi Junior High	Nickelodeon	ABC TV	28 January
(United Kingdom) Pie in the Sky	UKTV	ABC TV	1 February
(United Kingdom) Sunburn	UKTV		16 March
(Canada) / (United States) Sk8	Nickelodeon		5 May
(Canada) The Kids of Degrassi Street	Nickelodeon	ABC TV	28 July
(United Kingdom) Viva S Club	Nickelodeon		28 July
(Canada) Blobheads	Nickelodeon		17 October
(United Kingdom) North Square	UKTV	ABC TV	12 November
(Canada) Henry's World	Nickelodeon	ABC TV	1 October

== Specials ==
Program	Channel	Debut date
(United States) 2003 Kids' Choice Awards	Nickelodeon	10 May
(United States) 2003 Teen Choice Awards	Fox Kids	25 October

== Ending / resting this year ==
Date	Show	Channel	Debut
8 June	Always Greener	Seven Network	2001
30 June	Pirate Islands	Network Ten	3 March 2003
14 November	CNNNN	ABC TV	2002

== See also ==
- 2003 in Australia
- List of Australian films of 2003
