= Bloke =

Slang term for a man

Bloke is a slang term for a common man in the United Kingdom, Ireland, Australia, New Zealand and South Africa.

The earliest known usage is from the early 19th century, when it was recorded as a London slang term. The word's origin is unknown, and though many theories exist regarding its etymology, none are considered conclusive.

In Australia, a bloke is a unique masculine archetype associated with the country's national identity. The "Aussie bloke" has been portrayed in important works of art and associated with famous Australian men. "He's a good bloke" literally means "he's a good man".

== Origin ==
According to Quinion, Ernest Weekley and John Camden Hotten, bloke probably derives either from the Romany, language of the Roma, or from Shelta, a secret language of Welsh and Irish Travellers. These languages have roots with the Hindi word loke, a man. Lexicographer Eric Partridge conjectured the word loke was the original but an unspecified word "too low for mention" was the cause of a b- added in slang. The Oxford English Dictionary (OED) says the word is of "Origin unknown" but adds: "Ogilvie compares 'Gypsy and Hindi loke a man.'" The OED's first cited use is in 1861. Some believe it derives from the Celtic word ploc, a large, bull-headed person. The word first appears in early 19th century England possibly, according to Michael Quinion, as a variation of the slang term gloak, which itself was a variation of an older slang term buzzgloak, meaning pickpocket.

== History ==
Originally bloke was criminal jargon (or cant) for a man of superior station, someone who was not a criminal, as in: "I stole the bloke's watch right off 'im."

The earliest found usage, according to Quinion, is from 9 April 1829 in the court papers of the Old Bailey in the trial of 17-year-old John Daly, who was charged with housebreaking. It appears in the transcript once as blake and once as bloke. In 1839, H. Brandon included it in his book Poverty, Mendacity and Crime but spelled it bloak and defined it as "a gentleman". An accused poacher from Cobham, Surrey however, testifying in a court case reported in The Times in 1839, glosses the meaning merely as "a man". After the early 1850s, the term becomes more widely used in literature including by Henry Mayhew and George Augustus Sala to mean a man of any class, which is the meaning most popular today. The OED adds a specialist usage in naval slang from 1914 onwards for the commander of a warship, shown as "the Bloke" with a capital "B" in its examples.

In Australia, where it was used early on, the term meant "the boss" or someone of status. Sources report that in the US the term was in use by the late 19th century, although it is much less common now, and mainly is used in the sense of "stupid" or "worthless" person. This sense may originate with the Dutch blok, a fool, which is where blockhead comes from.

According to the Google Ngram culturomics project, which examines the popularity of words in published sources over time, bloke increased in popularity starting around the turn of the 20th century and reached a peak around 1950 before levelling off around 1960 at a flat level up to 1999.

== Australian bloke ==
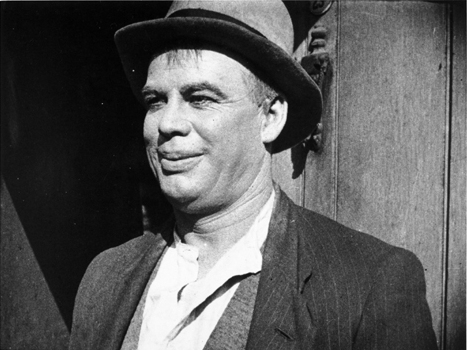
Arthur Tauchert, in The Sentimental Bloke (1918), portrayed an Aussie bloke of the period. He undergoes a change in what it means to be a man.

A bloke, or "Aussie bloke", is a masculine archetype unique to Australia. Sociologist Catriona Elder says in Being Australian (2008) that the 'Aussie bloke' is part of the Australian national identity:

...it is often suggested that nations are made up of 'types' of people. National identity is seen to be based on what are considered shared character traits often deriving from history. A good Australian example is the idea of the 'Aussie bloke' and the belief that this type of person is unique to Australia.

Australian historian Russel Ward in The Australian Legend (1958) "famously described" the mythical "Aussie bloke" as:

...a practical man, rough and ready in his manners and quick to decry any appearance of affectation in others... Though capable of great exertion in an emergency, he normally feels no impulse to work hard without good cause. He swears hard and consistently, gambles heavily and often, and drinks deeply on occasion... he is a greater knocker of eminent people unless, as is in the case of his sporting heroes, they are distinguished by physical prowess. He is fiercely independent... above all he will stick to his mates through thick and thin, even if he thinks they may be wrong... He tends to be a rolling stone, highly suspect if he should chance to gather much moss.

Ward's archetypal "bush bloke" was outdated even when he wrote about it, yet as Elder goes on to say:

...the power of this national type – the bush bloke – comes not from the fact that all Australians or even a majority of Australians live this life, but from an acceptance of it as a pleasureable and meaningful story that describes who Australians are. The image supposedly reflects a national character – that is, if you are Australian, some of these characteristics make up your identity. Many people argue that this image is outdated and inaccurate. In fact, Russel Ward (1958) argues that the image should be understood as typical, not common.

Many Australians today would no longer associate with Ward's archetypal bloke without some irony, yet it still lives on outside Australia. For example, in a 2000 Time magazine article published in the United States, Belinda Luscombe said "'The Bloke' is a certain kind of Australian or New Zealand male" and goes on to describe the "Classic Bloke" as "not a voluble beast. His speech patterns are best described as infrequent but colorful." He is "pragmatic rather than classy....does not whinge" and "knows how to take a beating". When Steve Irwin died, many Australians were embarrassed that he was portrayed as a typical Australian derived from Ward's "laconic bush bloke", but as Elder says, "Ward's Aussie bloke may be out of date... but the endeavor of creating stories about being Australian is still a central way in which being Australian is reinforced."

Dennis Carroll (1982) associates the "ordinary bloke" with a form of masculine individualism unique to Australia: "An individual who does not conform to the Australianist-related patterns of male behavior will be dismissed as an outsider... the kind of individualism based on too much success, wealth or power will take him beyond the valued reciprocates of egalitarian mateship. A man should be reasonably successful in areas which are not too threatening to others and remain an 'ordinary bloke', accessible, easy-going and sociable. Individualism is thus always... couched in terms of some approved, Australianist-related image of masculinity."

During World War I, one of the most popular Australian books of the era, Songs of a Sentimental Bloke (1915), was about a man who transforms himself into a domesticated, urbane and "sentimental bloke". C.J. Dennis's book of poems concerns a roughneck larrikin named Bill, a typical bloke who – uncharacteristically for a bloke – spends time in the city, finds love with a woman, settles down and is exposed to high culture. As the title suggests, the narrative revolves around questions of masculinity. It showed "that masculinist men can choose love and domesticity," and uses coarse language "to prove – amongst other things – that life and love can be just as real and splendid to the 'common' bloke as to the 'cultured'". The book was influential in Australian culture, it "sold an extraordinary 100,000 copies in four years", it "attained the status of cultural treasure" and remains the best-selling volume of Australian verse. Dennis's book was adapted to film, stage, ballet, musical and many gramophone recordings and radio and television programmes throughout the 20th century; however, it was most famously produced as a silent film, The Sentimental Bloke in 1918, starring Arthur Tauchert cast as the 'bloke' of the title. The film portrays Bill going through a transformation becoming a gentrified household breadwinner, yet also retaining his manly characteristics, the bloke who is more than a "careful little housewife". It is now considered one of the most important films in the Australian Film Commission's archives and called by them "Australia's finest film from the silent era".

Some famous Australians have been identified as blokes. Songs of a Sentimental Bloke includes illustrations of "bloke cupids" by the artist Hal Gye, which were said to resemble the politician Bert Edwards. In 1963, Australian politician Arthur Calwell (1896–1973) told the Australian House of Representatives that he was "an ordinary Australian bloke" in a rhetorical contrast with political opponent Robert Menzies. The aphorist William George Plunkett (1910–1975) described himself as an 'ordinary bloke' who liked to 'play around with words'. John Simpson Kirkpatrick (1892–1915) was known as 'the bloke with the donk' (donkey) for his work as a stretcher bearer during the Gallipoli Campaign. Examples of famous contemporary Australians associated with the bloke image include Bill Hunter, Paul Hogan and his fictitious movie character Crocodile Dundee, and Steve Irwin. Following the Australian leadership spill which installed Julia Gillard as the first female prime minister of Australia on 24 June 2010, media outlets began to focus on her de facto partner, Tim Mathieson, who was called "First Bloke" instead of "First Lady".

The word "bloke" does not always mean exclusively male. The term "blokey" was added in 1997 to the Australian Concise Oxford Dictionary. It is a variation on the noun "bloke" and means exclusively male.

=== Good bloke ===
In Australia, the term "good bloke" has a particular nuance that distinguishes a "good bloke" from just any "bloke". For instance, in Richard Walsh's essay Australia Observed (1985), Walsh (himself a noted good bloke) notes "The ultimate accolade in Australia is to be a "good bloke", meaning someone who is gregarious, hospitable, generous, warm hearted, and with a good sense of humour. In Australia it availeth a man nothing if he makes himself a fortune and is not a good bloke!" A good bloke is also readily identifiable by his unceasing fidelity to the principles of mateship and an egalitarian sensibility. For example, Australian World War II hero Fred Chilton was eulogised as follows by his fellow servicemen: "He was an excellent man. He wasn't highfalutin; he was just a good bloke."

The notion of the "good bloke" has been the subject of critique. Writer Clementine Ford has written that "men who beat women keep being given a free pass by the same people who swear up and down that they don't tolerate violence because they're a 'good bloke'". Similarly, Brigid Delaney has said that being a good bloke really "means drinking a lot. It means conforming to the norms of a place and not pushing back. It means protecting your mates and isolating those who take offence or complain." The darker elements of the Australian "good bloke" are also hinted at in the award-winning Australian country song by Stan Coster, "He's A Good Bloke When He's Sober". In 2017, the notion of the good bloke found itself under sustained attack for the first time in the Australian press when Australian rules footballer Bachar Houli, was given a reduced suspension for striking another player in the Australian Football League on the grounds that he was a good bloke. Eventually, this penalty was overturned on appeal. The so-called "good bloke defence" was criticised by many, including AFL official Nathan Burke, who argued that: "If you start bringing in 'this bloke's a good bloke, this bloke's not a good bloke', who are we to actually judge who is a good bloke and who isn't in the first place?" As of November 2022, the "good bloke defence" is not part of any Australian laws, nor has there been any proposal to enshrine the principle in the constitution (in contrast to the closely-connected Australian concept of mateship, which has been the subject of such a proposal).

The concept of the good bloke has been leveraged by mental health advocates in initiatives such as "The Good Bloke's Guide". An Australian charity, the Top Blokes Foundation was established to support young men's mental health. The use of the term "top blokes" is a reference to males who are admired by their peers.

In 2017, popular Australian comedians Hamish Blake and Andy Lee controversially named one James Lord, an electrician, Australia's "best bloke", based on his performance during a prank whereby he agreed over the telephone to provide a job reference to a person he had never met (actually the comedians), and then, when telephoned by the employer (actually the comedians again) proceeded to lie convincingly and enthusiastically on behalf of the person he had never met. Lord's position as "best bloke" was cemented when the comedians set up a further test, whereby Lord was unwittingly placed in a position where he, Blake and Lee were to drink a beer each, but were provided with only two beers for the purpose, and Lord offered to forgo a beer so that Blake and Lee could partake of the two beers. The position of "best bloke" is not to be confused with the position of "first bloke", a position held by Tim Mathieson, spouse of the 27th prime minister of Australia Julia Gillard, the first woman to hold the position.

The "good Aussie bloke" is generally regarded as being synonymous with the "good bloke".

== See also ==
- Aussie
- Dude
- Kiwi (nickname)
