= Akmal Saleh =

Australian comedian

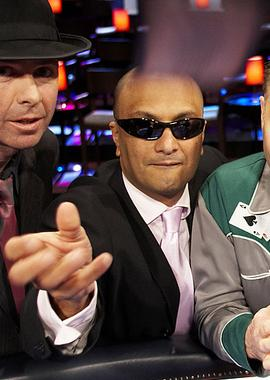
- Saleh in 2006
- Born: Akmal Abdul Malek Saleh; Cairo, Egypt
- Other name: Peter Saleh

Comedy career
- Years active: 1990–present
- Medium: Radio, television, comedy
- Genres: Stand-up comedy, acting
- Website: www.akmal.com.au

Akmal Saleh (Arabic: أكمل صالح, Coptic: Ⲁⲕⲙⲁⲗ Ⲥⲁⲗⲉϩ) is an Egyptian-Australian comedian and actor. He was born in Egypt and arrived in Sydney with his family in 1975 at the age of 10. He has been performing comedy since the early 1990s and his live shows have toured comedy festivals both within Australia and internationally. He has also made guest appearances on numerous Australian television series, including Superwog.

== Early life and education ==
Akmal Abdul Malek Saleh was born in Egypt around 1965. He moved to Sydney in 1975 at the age of 10 with his family. While his father Riyadh, a university professor, was fluent in English, neither Saleh nor his mother Marie could speak the language when they arrived. He grew up in Punchbowl, New South Wales and describes himself as having been a quiet child who was "the class clown's assistant. I was the guy who got his props ready." He grew up in a "very right-wing fundamentalist Christian family". He says that his parents contributed to his sense of humour. "My father ... was a very witty man with a quick mind. My mother was neurotic and mad. I think the combination of those two turned me into who I am," he says.

Saleh was 14, when his father died of Schistosomiasis contracted years earlier when swimming in the Nile River. Searching for something meaningful in his life, he became very religious and joined the Coptic Orthodox Christian church. However, within a few years he says he grew resentful of the religion, finding it "corrupt and hypocritical". Saleh says that when he discovered comedy it "filled the void that religion left", and his disillusionment with Christianity became a subject of comedy in his stand-up routine from early on.

Saleh started a number of university degrees and drove a taxi.

== Career ==
Saleh began performing stand-up comedy in 1990, when he decided to take part in an open mic night at the Sydney Comedy Store.

For a time, he performed under the alias 'Peter Saleh' – "so that people would think I was white", he says. "'Peter' seemed like a common name. 'Akmal' is such an awkward name, a very difficult name to remember." In 1992 he co-wrote and starred in the show All Aussies are Boofta and also the Best alongside fellow comedians Anthony Mir and Gary Eck, which enjoyed successful runs in various Sydney venues. This was followed by the live shows Bound and Gagged and Hoot, the latter of which toured the 1996 Adelaide Fringe Festival, the Melbourne International Comedy Festival, and the Edinburgh Festival Fringe. In 1999 the trio created the television show The Fifty-Foot Foot Show for Australia's The Comedy Channel. Saleh was credited onscreen by his real name; he says he had not bothered to use his stage name because he did not expect that many people would watch an obscure cable television show. "But strangely enough, enough people saw it and saw me in the street and said, "Hey Akmal, good show mate! Loved The Fifty-Foot Show." He says he found it so much nicer to be called by his real name, and has performed under it ever since. Saleh has also collaborated with Mir and Eck on the 2002 film You Can't Stop The Murders, which he co-wrote and starred in.

Saleh also performs solo stand-up shows, and has toured numerous comedy festivals in both in Australia and internationally. He commonly jokes about his own ethnicity and negative stereotypes regarding Middle Easterners. However, he says that he does not want to become known as an "ethnic comic" and likes to be able to talk about a "broad range of stuff". He says that he is most comfortable performing stand-up: "It's the thing that I do best. I'm not a radio guy. I'm a comedian doing radio."

Saleh emerged on Australian radio in January 2007, filling in for Merrick and Rosso on Nova for three weeks during the summer before receiving his own drive-time show. He was initially contracted to co-host the show alongside actor Matthew Newton, but Newton was unexpectedly dropped after news emerged that he was facing assault charges involving a former girlfriend, and instead Saleh made a solo debut. The show has since experienced several changes of co-hosts. Saleh co-hosted the drive shift The Wrong Way Home with comedians Cal Wilson and Ed Kavalee.

Saleh has appeared in numerous Australian television shows, such as Hey Hey it's Saturday, Rove Live, The Footy Show, The Glass House, In Siberia Tonight, Thank God You're Here, Big Questions, Hughesy, We Have a Problem, Spicks and Specks, Insight, Tonight Live with Steve Vizard and was a regular panel member on Good News Week.

He has performed voiceover work for animated television series The Wild Adventures of Blinky Bill and Tracey McBean. His voice can also be heard in 2020 film 100% Wolf, as well as its 2024 sequel 200% Wolf.

Additionally, Saleh appeared on the 2016 season of I'm A Celebrity … Get Me Out of Here. He accepted the role due to financial issues, without having previously watched the show – a move he subsequently described as “a horrible mistake", explaining that "the pressure to provide the laughs in camp was scarier to him than any tucker trial". He was the second contestant to be eliminated.

In 2010, Saleh released a memoir The Life of Akmal with publisher Random House.

== Personal life ==
Saleh is married; his wife, Cate, is a social worker. He has said that they did not intend to have children, a decision he says which is probably influenced by his father's untimely death.

In 2013, Akmal Saleh became an ambassador for the Top Blokes Foundation.

== Filmography ==
=== Film ===
| Year | Title | Role | Notes |
|---|---|---|---|
| 2003 | You Can't Stop the Murders | Constable Akmal | |
| 2005 | You and Your Stupid Mate | The Third AD | |
| 2006 | BoyTown | Man in Rio 1 | |
| 2020 | 100% Wolf | Hamish (voice) | Animated film |
| 2022 | Night at the Museum: Kahmunrah Rises Again | Seth (voice) | Animated film |
| 2024 | 200% Wolf | Hamish (voice) | Animated film |

=== Television ===
| Year | Title | Role | Notes |
|---|---|---|---|
| 1993 | G.P. | Mr. Bottros | |
| 1994 | Crazy Crosswords | Bhutros Bhutros Bhutros Galic | |
| 1999 | The 50 Foot Show | Various characters | |
| 2001–2011 | Tracey McBean | Jim McConnolly (voice) | Animated series |
| 2016–2017 | The Wild Adventures of Blinky Bill | Jacko Browing (voice) | Animated series |
| 2018 | Superwog | School Janitor | Season 1, episode 3: "The Final Exam" |
| 2026 | Guy Montgomery's Guy Mont-Spelling Bee (AU) | Himself | Season 3, episode 4 |

=== Video games ===
| Year | Title | Role | Notes |
|---|---|---|---|
| 2004 | Rome: Total War | | |

== Discography ==
=== Video albums ===
| Title | Details |
|---|---|
| Live And Uncensored | Released: November 2007; Label: Universal |
| The Life of Akmal | Released: November 2017; Label: Universal |
| Transparent | Released: August 2018; Label: Universal |

== Awards and nominations ==
| Year | Work | Award | Category | Result | Ref. |
|---|---|---|---|---|---|
| 2006 | Akmal Live and Uncensored | Helpmann Awards | Best Comedy Performer | Nominated | |
| 2007 | Akmal Live and Uncensored | Helpmann Awards | Best Comedy Performer | Nominated | |
| 2008 | Akmal Live and Uncensored | ARIA Music Awards | Best Comedy Release | Nominated | |
| 2018 | Transparent | ARIA Music Awards | Best Comedy Release | Nominated | |
