= Dennis Ferguson =

Australian sex offender

- Ferguson in 2009
- Born: Dennis Raymond Ferguson; 5 February 1948; Sydney, New South Wales, Australia
- Died: c. 30 December 2012 (aged 64); Surry Hills, New South Wales, Australia
- Status: Released
- Convictions: Kidnapping; gross indecency; indecent dealing; carnal knowledge; child sexual abuse
- Penalty: 14 years (1989–2003); 15 months (2003–2004)

Dennis Raymond Ferguson (5 February 1948 – c. 30 December 2012) was an Australian sex offender convicted of child sexual abuse. In 1988, he kidnapped and sexually abused three children, and was sentenced to 14 years imprisonment. Ferguson was forced by public hostility and news media attention to relocate his residence on numerous occasions, from various locations in New South Wales and Queensland.

== Early life ==
Ferguson was born on 5 February 1948. He was born legally blind and attended St Edmund's School for the Blind at Wahroonga. In 1958, he appeared on the front page of the Sydney Morning Herald presenting a posy of flowers to Queen Elizabeth The Queen Mother. Although his age was reported as six, he was then ten years old. His parents separated early and his mother soon took a new partner, who Ferguson claimed sexually abused him for seven years, even after Ferguson was declared a neglected child and placed in a state home. Shortly after his abuser died, Ferguson says he "pissed on his grave".

== Criminal history ==
According to court records, Ferguson's pre-1987 criminal history contains "many convictions for false pretences, various assaults on children and indecent assaults on females", including five convictions for child molestation. In 1987, Ferguson was imprisoned in Long Bay Correctional Centre after being convicted on multiple fraud charges.

After being released from Long Bay Jail in July 1987, Ferguson, then aged 39, and his 23-year-old male lover, Alexandria George Brookes, abducted three children, two boys and a girl, from Sydney aged six, seven, and eight. Ferguson had previously gotten to know the children's father, who was a fellow inmate in Long Bay Jail, and Ferguson was told that the children had previously been sexually abused. Ferguson and Brookes flew the children to Brisbane, and sexually assaulted them in a house in the Brisbane suburb of Kedron. The following night, Ferguson and Brookes moved the three children to a motel in the suburb of Ascot, where they again abused the children. Police arrested Ferguson and Brookes at the motel, where they found Ferguson naked with the children. Ferguson told police, "I can help you. Pornography. Kiddy porn, I can get you kiddy porn." Ferguson claimed he was innocent, accusing one of the boys he molested of committing the crimes, but a jury found him guilty of all counts of abduction and assault of the three children. He was sentenced to 14 years' imprisonment, by a judge who noted there was no chance he would be rehabilitated.

While in jail he refused to take part in rehabilitation programs, and attempted to obtain police photographs of his victims under the Freedom of Information Act. An order was obtained requiring Ferguson to report his whereabouts to police after fellow inmates reported his plans to molest the eight-year-old daughter of the family with whom he would reside after being released.

In 2003, New South Wales Police surveillance located Ferguson at Parramatta Public School. Ferguson was forbidden from entering schools and claimed he was trying to distribute cleaning products for groups needing to raise funds. A court convicted him under the NSW Child Protection Offenders Registration Act, and he was sentenced to a further 15 months' prison in the John Morony Correctional Centre. He was released in December 2004.

The following year, in November 2005, Ferguson was charged with sexually assaulting a 5-year-old girl at her home in the Queensland town of Dalby. In a rare legal move, the judge granted Ferguson a bench trial (without a jury), as he considered Ferguson would not receive a fair trial by jury, due to the enormous amount of media coverage. The judge found that while the girl had been molested when Ferguson, convicted child sexual abuser Allan Guy, and another man had been at her house, it could not be proven that Ferguson had been responsible for the abuse.

== Relocation ==
After being released from jail in 2004, Ferguson was forced to move from numerous locations in Queensland, due to public pressure and media attention. Angry residents forced him to flee the towns of Bundaberg, Toowoomba and Murgon. In February 2005, he settled in Ipswich with another paedophile, but was again found by neighbours and the media. There were reports of rocks being thrown at his house. A judge awarded Ferguson $2,250 in compensation from an invalid Ipswich pensioner who pleaded guilty to threatening to kill him. Other protests have been more peaceable.

In July 2008, he moved to a rural property near Miles, Queensland, but after word of his location spread, cars began to arrive at the property, and the police were called after 60 people began chanting anti-Ferguson slogans.

In 2009, he moved into a public housing apartment in the Sydney suburb of Ryde where he was given a five-year lease. Some residents of the area were outraged at Ferguson's presence, after news organisations revealed where he was living - near a primary school and playgrounds. Angry males shouted on the street, and police found a Molotov cocktail near Ferguson's apartment building; Ferguson claimed that one man broke into his house and assaulted him. By 2010, neighbours had forced him to leave Ryde.

New South Wales Police attempted to obtain a court order banning Ferguson from public pools and parks, after he began frequenting a pool during primary school children's swimming lessons. While the safety order was denied by a judge, they did succeed in obtaining an order requiring him to notify the child protection authority before engaging in charity activities that would put him in contact with children, a precaution that was prompted after he was spotted selling children's toys for a charity for which he had registered using his middle name, Ray. Ferguson had been selling them without a legally mandated permit and police approval.

A program set up by the federal government agency Centrelink to reunite missing persons was suspended indefinitely in September 2009, after it was discovered that Ferguson had accessed the service to reunite with his 1987 criminal accomplice, Alexandria George Brookes.

In 2010, controversy arose when a portrait of Ferguson with his mentor, Brett Collins from Justice Action, was entered in the Archibald Prize. NSW Premier Kristina Keneally said that it had gone too far in terms of artistic license.

On 8 July 2012, Ferguson was spotted by The Daily Telegraph at Circular Quay in the Sydney central business district, selling RSPCA merchandise under the name, Ray Ferguson and holding up a tin of kangaroo-shaped biscuits. His stall offered various animal-shaped shortbread biscuits, pens, stickers and badges for the RSPCA. When confronted by journalist Clementine Cuneo, Ferguson declined to say whether he had notified police about his charity work. "They know about me, that's all I will say," he said. That night the RSPCA said that it had no idea that the man named Ray who signed up as a volunteer fundraiser was a child sex offender. NSW Police obtained an order requiring Ferguson to notify the Child Protection Authority before engaging in any charity work that could put him in contact with children. Ferguson confirmed he was Dennis Ferguson, using his middle name for charity work. Police said that the details on the Child Protection Register could not be made public.

== Legislative changes ==
In September 2009, in response to public anger at Ferguson living in the Ryde area in the Northern Suburbs region of Sydney, the Government of New South Wales under Premier Nathan Rees and the Housing Minister David Borger moved to introduce legislation to allow the government to evict child sex offenders from public housing. Critics dubbed the legislation the Dennis Ferguson Act, and said it was created as a result of the state government caving in to vigilantism.

== Death ==
On 30 December 2012, Ferguson was found dead in his Surry Hills Flat in inner-Sydney. He had been dead for several days before his body was found. On 6 January 2013, News Limited reported that Ferguson deliberately ended his life by discontinuing his diabetes medication. However, friends said that Ferguson left no suicide note and was feeling confident about his upcoming court case, after being caught trying to sign up to do volunteer work with children in Bondi Junction in October and November. It also reported that shortly before his death, he had told supporters that police were making his life a "living hell". Ferguson's advocate, the Justice Action campaigner Brett Collins, said that the police continuously "undermined" Ferguson's efforts to redeem himself and claimed that the police had informed the media about his whereabouts at least twice.

After Ferguson's death, his former counsellor, Wendell Rosevear, explained how Ferguson had worked to address his behaviour. In an interview with ABC News, Rosevear said that Ferguson was "honest about the dimensions of his own life, both victimisation and perpetration" and stated his opinion that such honesty is "the biggest predictor of someone's resolution."

== See also ==
- List of Australian criminals
