= List of 2003 box office number-one films in Australia =

This is a list of films which placed number-one at the box office in Australia during 2003. Amounts are in Australian dollars. This article transitions from weekend end date to week end date, thus accounting for the additional week (a total of 53). Also included are the positions at the box office other films opened at. Quite a number of these are films from the previous year due to normal Australian film distribution delays.

== Number-one films ==
†	This implies the highest-grossing movie of the year.

#	Week ending	Film	Box office	Openings
1	1 January 2003	The Lord of the Rings: The Two Towers	$19,597,818	The Tuxedo (#5), Treasure Planet (#6), Two Weeks Notice (#7), Adaptation (#10), Frida (#12), Bowling for Columbine (#13), The Hot Chick (#14), Mostly Martha (#18), The Master of Disguise (#20)
2	8 January 2003	The Lord of the Rings: The Two Towers	$9,084,170	
3	15 January 2003	Catch Me If You Can	$5,148,124	Spy Kids 2: The Island of Lost Dreams (#4)
4	22 January 2003	8 Mile	$7,526,113	Analyze That (#6), The Quiet American (#7), Like Mike (#8)
5	29 January 2003	8 Mile	$4,264,954	Chicago (#2), I Spy (#5), About Schmidt preview (#19)
6	5 February 2003	Chicago	$2,437,504	One Hour Photo (#3), Frailty (#17)
7	12 February 2003	Chicago	$1,870,781	Star Trek: Nemesis (#2), About Schmidt (#7), Far from Heaven (#11), They (#13), City by the Sea (#17)
8	19 February 2003	Gangs of New York	$2,814,649	Undercover Brother (#10), Talk to Her (#19)
9	26 February 2003	Just Married	$2,944,361	The Hours (#3), Half Past Dead (#5), The Rules of Attraction (#12), Trapped (#17)
10	5 March 2003	Jackass: The Movie	$2,018,645	The Recruit (#3), Swimming Upstream (#10), Solaris (#17)
11	12 March 2003	Maid in Manhattan	$3,029,089	Final Destination 2 (#2), The Pianist (#9), Ballistic: Ecks vs. Sever (#13)
12	19 March 2003	Maid in Manhattan	$1,976,079	Antwone Fisher (#10), You Can't Stop the Murders (#13), City of God (#17), Knockaround Guys (#18)
13	26 March 2003	Daredevil	$3,952,322	The Emperor's Club (#11), Dog Soldiers (#17), 24 Hour Party People (#18)
14	2 April 2003	Ned Kelly	$3,439,557	Cradle 2 the Grave (#3)
15	9 April 2003	Ned Kelly	$1,960,158	Bringing Down the House (#2), Dreamcatcher (#3), What a Girl Wants (#4), Punch-Drunk Love (#10), Read My Lips (#18)
16	16 April 2003	Johnny English	$3,980,373	Fat Pizza (#2), Shanghai Knights (#3), The Jungle Book 2 (#7), Kangaroo Jack (#8), The Wild Thornberrys Movie (#9), All or Nothing (#20)
17	23 April 2003	Anger Management	$5,124,333	Ripley's Game (#17), The Magdalene Sisters (#18), Nowhere in Africa (#19)
18	30 April 2003	How to Lose a Guy in 10 Days	$3,722,949	X-Men 2 (#5)
19	7 May 2003	X-Men 2	$7,610,042	Russian Ark (#12), Anita and Me (#19)
20	14 May 2003	X-Men 2	$3,480,612	Whale Rider (#2), National Security (#5), Alexandra's Project (#7)
21	21 May 2003	The Matrix Reloaded	$14,553,522	
22	28 May 2003	The Matrix Reloaded	$7,468,147	Phone Booth (#2), The Life of David Gale (#6), Horseplay (#14), The Crime of Father Amaro (#15)
23	4 June 2003	The Matrix Reloaded	$4,131,487	Basic (#3), Old School (#4), Secretary (#9), Balzac and the Little Chinese Seamstress (#16), The Lizzie McGuire Movie (#20)
24	11 June 2003	2 Fast 2 Furious	$7,419,656	The Four Feathers (#9), Igby Goes Down (#11), 25th Hour (#12)
25	18 June 2003	2 Fast 2 Furious	$2,866,045	Bulletproof Monk (#3), The Core (#4), A Man Apart (#5), White Oleander (#8)
26	25 June 2003	Bruce Almighty	$6,523,891	Travelling Birds (#9)
27	2 July 2003	Bruce Almighty	$4,803,887	Hulk (#2), Daddy Day Care (#3)
28	9 July 2003	Charlie's Angels: Full Throttle	$8,786,213	Sinbad: Legend of the Seven Seas (#6), The Dancer Upstairs (#11), Help! I'm a Fish (#16)
29	16 July 2003	Charlie's Angels: Full Throttle	$4,939,410	The Real Cancun (#8), I Capture the Castle (#9), Auto Focus (#14)
30	23 July 2003	Terminator 3: Rise of the Machines	$9,231,811	The Good Thief (#12), Personal Velocity: Three Portraits (#20)
31	30 July 2003	Terminator 3: Rise of the Machines	$3,964,697	Bad Eggs (#3), Confidence (#5), Confessions of a Dangerous Mind (#7), Malibu's Most Wanted (#8), Biker Boyz (#10), A Mighty Wind (#14)
32	6 August 2003	Terminator 3: Rise of the Machines	$2,291,756	Identity (#2), View from the Top (#5), Danny Deckchair (#6), Extreme Ops (#11), Wrong Turn (#12)
33	13 August 2003	American Pie: The Wedding	$5,540,460	Friday After Next (#15)
34	20 August 2003	American Pie: The Wedding	$3,115,507	Down with Love (#2), Tears of the Sun (#3), Take Away (#7), The Night We Called It a Day (#8), Narc (#11), Cypher (#15)
35	27 August 2003	The Italian Job	$3,649,566	Buffalo Soldiers (#8), It Runs in the Family (#11)
36	3 September 2003	Finding Nemo	$9,757,350	The In-Laws (#4), Darkness Falls (#5), The Rage in Placid Lake (#10), Man on the Train (#13)
37	10 September 2003	Finding Nemo	$7,318,444	28 Days Later (#3), Hollywood Homicide (#4), Titanic 3D: Ghosts of the Abyss (#10), My Little Eye (#15), Undead (#18)
38	17 September 2003	Pirates of the Caribbean: The Curse of the Black Pearl	$6,962,449	Legally Blonde 2 (#3), American Splendor (#10), Together (#15)
39	24 September 2003	Pirates of the Caribbean: The Curse of the Black Pearl	$4,983,581	Bad Boys II (#2), Freaky Friday (#5), Rugrats Go Wild (#6), Agent Cody Banks (#8)
40	1 October 2003	Finding Nemo	$4,335,509	Lara Croft Tomb Raider: The Cradle of Life (#3), The Wannabes (#9), Japanese Story (#10)
41	8 October 2003	The League of Extraordinary Gentlemen	$4,218,626	Matchstick Men (#9), Swimming Pool (#14)
42	15 October 2003	Pirates of the Caribbean: The Curse of the Black Pearl	$1,805,456	Calendar Girls (#3), Gettin' Square (#9), Perfect Strangers (#15)
43	22 October 2003	Kill Bill: Vol. 1	$3,118,560	Head of State (#13)
44	29 October 2003	Intolerable Cruelty	$2,661,924	Freddy vs. Jason (#3), Mambo Italiano (#7), Raising Victor Vargas (#19)
45	5 November 2003	Intolerable Cruelty	$2,014,052	Runaway Jury (#3), The Medallion (#7), Holes (#10), Laurel Canyon (#15)
46	12 November 2003	The Matrix Revolutions	$9,733,089	Le Divorce (#6)
47	19 November 2003	The Matrix Revolutions	$3,586,349	Seabiscuit (#2), In the Cut (#4), Alien: The Director's Cut (#14), Spellbound (#15), The Honourable Wally Norman (#20)
48	26 November 2003	School of Rock	$2,740,753	The Texas Chainsaw Massacre (#3), Mystic River (#4), Uptown Girls (#6), Nicholas Nickleby (#19)
49	3 December 2003	S.W.A.T.	$3,697,004	Elf (#3), Good Boy! (#10)
50	10 December 2003	Master and Commander: The Far Side of the World	$4,210,955	Cabin Fever (#8)
51	17 December 2003	Scary Movie 3	$4,102,664	Looney Tunes: Back in Action (#4), Dumb and Dumberer: When Harry Met Lloyd (#13)
52	24 December 2003	Peter Pan	$2,520,855	The Spanish Apartment (#11), The Lord of the Rings: The Two Towers – Extended (#15)
53	31 December 2003	The Lord of the Rings: The Return of the King †	$18,985,415	Love Actually (#2), Brother Bear (#3), Lost in Translation (#9), Good Bye, Lenin! (#13), Bright Young Things (#15), Dogville (#17)

== See also ==
- List of Australian films – Australian films by year
- 2003 in film
