= 200% Wolf =

2024 animated comedy film

- Theatrical release Poster
- Directed by: Alexs Stadermann
- Screenplay by: Fin Edquist
- Based on: The Werewolf Saga by Jayne Lyons
- Produced by: Barbara Stephen; Alexia Gates-Foale; Carmen Perez-Marsa Roca; Tracy Lenon
- Starring: Samara Weaving; Jennifer Saunders; Ilai Swindells; Akmal Saleh; Peter McAllum; Sarah Harper; Elizabeth Nabben
- Edited by: Jonathan Tappin
- Music by: Ash Gibson Greig
- Production companies: Flying Bark Productions; Atlantika Films; 200 Wolf Pelicula, A.I.E
- Distributed by: StudioCanal (Australia); Flins y Piniculas (Spain)
- Release dates: 4 July 2024 (New Zealand); 8 August 2024 (Australia); 5 December 2025 (Spain)
- Running time: 98 minutes
- Countries: Australia; Spain
- Language: English
- Box office: $14.6 million

200% Wolf is a 2024 animated fantasy teen comedy film directed by Alexs Stadermann and based on The Werewolf Saga by Jayne Lyons. It serves as a sequel to the 2020 film 100% Wolf, focusing on Freddy's journey to reclaim his inner wolf while facing new threats and challenges. The film features voice performances from Samara Weaving, Jennifer Saunders, Ilai Swindells, Akmal Saleh, Peter McAllum, Sarah Harper, and Elizabeth Nabben.

== Plot ==
One year after the event of the first film, Freddy Lupin rescues a group of people from a burning airship. He expects to be viewed as a hero by his pack, but is mocked by them instead. Seeking to become a true werewolf and overcome his current were-poodle form, Freddy seeks out the Summoning Stone to fulfill his wish. Moopoo, a baby moon spirit, fulfills Freddy's plea and descends to Earth, transforming Freddy into a true werewolf.

Lady Hightail tells Freddy the story of Max, a werewolf and sorcerer who was not respected due to her weaknesses and sought a solution by studying forbidden earth magic. She used this magic in an attempt to gain recognition from the Night Patrol. But unfortunately, Max was shunned by the other werewolves and tried to steal the spirit moon's power. But she was punished by the moon spirits, losing her power of transformation. Freddy is blamed for bringing the earth and the spirit planes into contact, therefore threatening the cosmic balance. If Moopoo remains on Earth, he could cause irreversible damage.

Freddy and Batty plan to find Max to use the portal spell to get Moopoo home. Moopoo uses his powers to absorb dark magic from the monstrous Whoopsie, causing him to behave mischievously and want to absorb more dark magic. When Freddy finds Max, she betrays him, using her magic to drain the moon's power, alter gravity worldwide, and regain her werewolf form. Freddy manages to stop Max and transform her into a powerless frog. However, the dark magic attack transforms Moopoo into a gigantic monster. Freddy calms down Moopoo, who uses his magic to stop the Moon from crashing into Earth and bring gravity to normal.

Freddy gives up his energy to save a weakened Moopoo, losing his wolf form in the process. Moopoo, now restored, departs to the moon and reunites with the other moon spirits. The spirits restore Freddy's were-poodle form, with him accepting himself as his pack bows as respect.

In the post-credit scene, Max is still a frog; her instincts make her eat a fly, to her dismay.

== Voice cast ==
- Ilai Swindells as Freddy Lupin
- Samara Weaving as Batty
- Elizabeth Nabben as Moopoo
- Jennifer Saunders as Max
- Sarah Georgina as Mother Moonspirit, the mother of Moopoo
- Peter McAllum as Hotspur and Flasheart Lupin. McAllum reprises both roles from the 100% Wolf: Legend of the Moonstone and Book of Hath series and replaces Rupert Degas and Jai Courtney from the first film.
- Janice Petersen as Felicity Hazzard
- Heather Mitchell as Lady Hightail. Mitchell replaces Kate Hall from the first film.
- Michael Bourchier as Lord Hightail
- Alexs Stadermann as Bruno and Gargar
- Akmal Saleh as Hamish
- Sarah Harper as Twitchy
- Anna Nguyen as Additional Voices
- Shirley Yao as Additional Voices
- Matias Biondi as Additional Voices
- Eden Diebel as Additional Voices
- Agatha Ozdowska as Additional Voices
- Tracy Lenon as Additional Voices
- Jonathan Tappin as Additional Voices
- Caz Prescott as Night Patrol Wolf Stu
- Virginie Laverdure as Additional Voices

== Production ==
An Australian-Spanish co-production, the sequel to 100% Wolf was announced following the original film's success, with director Alexs Stadermann returning to helm the project. Screenwriter Fin Edquist developed the screenplay based on Jayne Lyons' book series, while Akmal Saleh and other returning cast members reprised their roles. The film was produced by Alpha Studios in Sydney, Australia, and introduces several new characters, including a mischievous moon sprite that adds a cosmic twist to the plot.

== Release ==
200% Wolf was first released in New Zealand on July 4, 2024. It was later released to Australian cinemas on August 8, 2024. It had a limited release in the United States on August 23, by Viva Pictures. It was also released in the United Kingdom on September 20, by Signature Entertainment. The film was showcased at the Sydney Film Festival, receiving praise for its dynamic animation and comedic elements. It was released theatrically in Spain on 5 December 2025.

== Reception ==
200% Wolf received positive response from critics. The film was commended for its humor, vibrant animation, and engaging storyline. Critics also appreciated its themes of self-acceptance and the balance between cosmic forces.
