= Denham Hitchcock =

Australian journalist and broadcaster

- Occupations: Journalist; broadcaster
- Years active: 1994–present
- Employer: Network 10
- Known for: Television journalism
- Television: Nine News, Sunday Night, 7News Spotlight, 10 News+

Denham Hitchcock is an Australian journalist and broadcaster. He is well known for his work with the Seven Network where he was a senior reporter for Sunday Night and 7NEWS Spotlight. In January 2023 Hitchcock announced he had resigned from Seven. In 2025, He began hosting Network 10's brand new nightly news and current affairs program 10 News+ alongside Amelia Brace.

== Career ==
Hitchcock started his media career as a junior researcher for Channel 7’s current affairs program, Today Tonight, in 1994. Soon after, he was elevated to the position of researcher/producer on Today Tonight and then The Times.

Hitchcock went on to become a producer and part-time news reporter for the Seven Early Morning News, the 6 pm Seven News bulletin, and later an executive producer for the 11AM program.

In 2010 Hitchcock was awarded the coveted position of US correspondent for the Nine Network.

In 2011 he provided 24-hour coverage on the death of Osama bin Laden. He covered the Typhoon Haiyan for the channel by hiring a private plane to fly into the devastated area. He was sent to Vatican City for the 2013 papal conclave, and was reporting live on the streets in New York during the Hurricane Sandy in 2012. Hitchcock has covered a series of mass shootings in the United States including the Sandy Hook Elementary School shooting where 25 people were killed.

In 2014 Hitchcock left the Nine Network and returned to Australia to work for Channel Seven’s program, Sunday Night.

In 2017 he went to Mexico to confront a plastic surgeon whose negligence led to the death of several patients including an Australian woman. The same year, he flew to Colombia to report on the controversial arrest and imprisonment of Australian woman Cassandra Sainsbury, accused of being a cocaine drug mule.

Hitchcock has travelled to Iraq and Syria twice to report on the rise and fall of the ISIL.

In 2020 the Sunday Night program was discontinued by the Seven Network Hitchcock was retained to create hour long documentaries to fill the current affairs void left behind. The first report was on the 2019–20 Australian bushfire season.

Hitchcock has written many articles for major Australian newspapers such as The Sydney Morning Herald and The Daily Telegraph. He has also compiled several reports for the world's largest men's magazine, Men's Health, including a visit to a traditional kickboxing camp in Thailand, and later completing a five-day fast.

In January 2023 Hitchcock announced on his Instagram page that he had resigned from the Seven Network. He stated: “I have resigned from the Channel Seven network. This is normally where people say they need to spend more time with their family, and that is certainly true, my girls are everything to me, but there’s other reasons..." before stating his intention to sail around the Pacific Islands.

In May 2023 it was announced that he would be presenting a television documentary for Sky News Australia entitled Who murdered Marea? which would explore the unsolved 2003 murder of former charity shop worker Marea Yann.

In 2025, Network 10 announced that Hitchcock would present the forthcoming brand new nightly news and current affairs program titled 10 News+ alongside television reporter Amelia Brace. The program launched in June as the replacement show for the network's long running show The Project after it was axed.

== Personal life ==
Denham Hitchcock is the son of former Channel 10 journalist Kevin Hitchcock.

In 2008 Hitchcock and fellow journalist Daniel Sutton were allegedly attacked by members of the Bega Roosters rugby league team while attempting to leave the Commercial Hotel in Bega after having dinner. Police subsequently charged three men with assault. The journalists had been in Bega covering the Tathra wharf drownings. Hitchcock sustained facial injuries in the alleged attack and was taken to hospital.

In 2021, shortly after receiving the Pfizer–BioNTech COVID-19 vaccine, he was hospitalized for pericarditis, a side effect linked to the spike protein injection.

Hitchcock is known for his passion of sailing. After purchasing a second hand yacht, he spent two years restoring it before sailing from Sydney to Lord Howe Island and Fiji in 2019.
