= 100% Wolf =

2020 film

- Theatrical release poster
- Directed by: Alexs Stadermann
- Written by: Fin Edquist
- Based on: 100% Wolf by Jayne Lyons
- Produced by: Alexia Gates-Foale; Barbara Stephen
- Starring: Jai Courtney; Samara Weaving; Magda Szubanski; Rhys Darby; Ilai Swindells; Akmal Saleh; Rupert Degas; Jane Lynch
- Cinematography: Heidy Villafane
- Edited by: Simon Klaebe
- Music by: Ash Gibson Greig
- Production company: Flying Bark Productions
- Distributed by: Studio 100 Film
- Release date: 29 May 2020
- Running time: 96 minutes
- Country: Australia
- Language: English
- Box office: $9.8 million

100% Wolf is a 2020 Australian animated adventure fantasy comedy film directed by Alexs Stadermann and produced by Alexia Gates-Foale and Barbara Stephen. It is adapted from Jayne Lyons' 2009 novel of the same name. It features the voices of Jai Courtney, Samara Weaving, Magda Szubanski, Rhys Darby, Ilai Swindells, Akmal Saleh, Rupert Degas, and Jane Lynch. The film follows a teen boy who is part of a werewolf family, but when his first transformation turns him into a poodle, he sets out on an adventure to prove he belongs.

100% Wolf was produced by Flying Bark Productions and released on May 29, 2020, by Studio 100 Film. It received generally mixed reviews from critics and grossed $8.1 million worldwide.

A sequel, 200% Wolf, was released in August 2024.

== Plot ==
Freddy Lupin is the young heir to a werewolf pack that has been protecting their local town for years and does not get along with dogs. When he attempts to follow his family during their nightly patrol using a magical moonstone, he loses the moonstone to an ice cream man called Foxwell Cripp, and his father Flashheart apparently dies after falling from a cliff while trying to save Cripp. Freddy's uncle, his father's brother, Hotspur, becomes the new pack leader.

Six years later, the time comes for Freddy to experience his first wolf transformation, but despite the encouragement of long-term housekeeper Mrs. Mutton, he is humiliated when he turns into a poodle instead. Faced with the disdain of his pack, Freddy is challenged to prove his wolf status by moonrise the next day or risk being banished. Freddy decides to retrieve the moonstone from Cripp, who has become obsessed with proving that werewolves exist.

While searching in town, Freddy befriends Batty, a mixed-breed stray dog also known as 'Houndini' for her ability to escape the dog catchers consistently. Batty leads him to Cripp and they manage to retrieve the moonstone. They are later both caught by dog catchers and placed in the Coldfax Dog Pound, which is actually run by Hotspur and meet three dogs: Hamish the Scottish Terrier, Bruno the Blue Heeler, and Twitchy the Chihuahua. Hostpur incidentally learns by Cripp himself that a poodle stole the moonstone and is informed by online pictures of the dogs on his database that Coldfax has captured Freddy. He goes there pretending to be willing to adopt the stray poodle but takes the moonstone off Freddy and abandons his nephew to his fate. Freddy confesses to Batty and the others that he was meant to be a wolf and reveals the truth about his family. Meanwhile, Cripp figures out that the Lupins are werewolves.

After an escape attempt goes wrong, Freddy is sent to a pit with 'the Beast', an unknown monster that supposedly eats dogs. Freddy discovers that the 'Beast' is actually Flasheart, whom the dog catchers captured after he was injured by the fall years before. He also learns that a jealous Hotspur left his brother in Coldfax with a silver bracelet to keep him trapped in his wolf state. Batty and the other dogs escape into the vents. They help Freddy free his father and learn that Hotspur is planning to turn all the dogs into wigs. As they escape, the Coldfax guards ambush them. However, Mrs. Mutton, realizing Hotspur's betrayal, arrives to fight. Twitchy and Mrs. Mutton stay behind while the others flee.

Freddy, now back in his human form, leads Flasheart and the dogs home where they confront Hotspur. Cripp arrives and attacks the wolves with silver concentrate, but Freddy stops Cripp's attack. Hotspur activates the wig-making machine while the wolves are weakened by the silver, but Mrs. Mutton and Twitchy free the remaining Coldfax dogs and destroy the machine. The dogs get the wolves to safety, and Freddy lures his uncle to the mansion roof. Transforming back into a poodle in the moonlight and accepting his form, Freddy lets out a loud roar to affirm his status as an alpha wolf, sending Hotspur falling back into the mansion.

Sometime later, Freddy's reflections reveal that not only have werewolves and dogs gotten on better terms, but the pack has also opened the mansion up to all dogs. Hotspur and his children are reduced to dog-walkers and caring for the dogs. Coldfax is shut down and the commander is arrested. Cripp has started selling ice cream at the mansion. Flasheart returns to his old role as pack leader, but he assures Freddy that he is proud of him and believes he will be a good leader when the time comes.

== Voice cast ==
- Ilai Swindells as Freddy Lupin
  - Jerra Wright Smith as young Freddy Lupin
- Samara Weaving as Batty
- Jai Courtney as Flasheart Lupin
- Rupert Degas as Hotspur Lupin
- Jane Lynch as The Commander
- Rhys Darby as Foxwell Cripp
- Magda Szubanski as Mrs. Mutton
- Akmal Saleh as Hamish
- Loren Gray (US) and Sarah Harper (AUS) as Twitchy
- Michael Bourchier as Lord Hightail
- Kate Hall as Lady Hightail
- Adriane Daff as Harriet
- Liam Graham as Chariot
- Alexs Stadermann as Cerberus and Bruno
- Jenna Suffern as Dolph
- James Marsh as Stu the Dogcatcher
- Cam Ralph as Steve the Dogcatcher
- Jessica Window as Street Hawker Dog

== Reception ==
100% Wolf received mixed-to-positive from critics and earned a total of $7.7 million worldwide.

On Rotten Tomatoes, the film has an approval rating of 69% based on reviews from 16 critics, with an average rating of 5.8/10.

A 2 stars out of 5 review Common Sense Media, however, found the film included "mild peril, slapstick violence, scenes inspired by classic horror movies, and potty humor" and had entertaining value but lacked educational content. A 3 stars out 5 review for The Hollywood News stated "100% Wolf capitalises on familiar narrative threads to ensure that family fun is maintained. So get ready for familiar story elements from iconic films including The Lion King, How to Train Your Dragon and just a smattering of The Corpse Bride . By borrowing these elements, it ensures that it gets the young audience on board more easily." While giving the film a similar rating, Tyler Collins, of Oakville News, was much more critical and concluded, "There's no audience who'd get anything of value from seeing 100% Wolf unless you want to be 100% weirded out."

Cath Clarke, in her review for The Guardian, wrote, "Do dog pounds exist anywhere outside kids movies any more? Maybe not, but Freddy's incarceration gives the film its best characters, including a pugnaciously chippy chihuahua and a doberman with a Werner Herzog accent. There's also a funny moment where Freddy, who has been adamant he won't urinate like a dog, can't hold it in any longer and lets rip mid action scene, spraying pee like machine gunfire."

"100% Wolf has all the right elements to it, it just heavily borrows moments and characters from other bigger budget hits. This feels at best an ode to such animations, and at worse aping and unimaginative. Albeit the film is readily consumable because of the former, but a pink-haired werepoodle alone does not make things intriguing enough – even if likeable Freddy wins us all over in the end and prompts calls for Freddy the werepoodle toys from the kids.", commented Lisa Giles-Keddie on HeyUGuys. The Globe and Mail offered a similar appraisal, criticising the film's predictability.

A positive review in The Curb, however, stated, "While the Freo-centric iconography may not be the first thing across every viewers mind, the localised jokes and vernacular will ensure you notice the Aussie-infused charm of 100% Wolf, helping make the distinctly non-Australian story feel comfortably ocker."

== Other media ==
=== Television series ===
A 26-episode TV series spin-off, 100% Wolf: Legend of the Moonstone, screened on ABC ME on December 28, 2020, produced by Flying Bark Productions and Studio 100 Animation. Season 2 (The Book of Hath) aired on ABC ME on May 1, 2023.

=== Sequel ===
A sequel titled 200% Wolf was announced in July 2022. On April 28, 2024, Flying Bark Productions announced via social media that the film would be released on August 8 in Australian cinemas and on August 23 in the United States.
