= Martin Morning =

French animated series

- Genre: Fantasy comedy
- Created by: Denis Olivieri; Claude Prothée; Luc Vinciguerra; Jacky Bretaudeau; Tian Xiao Zhang
- Written by: Jean-Rémi François; Bruno Merle; Paul Nougha; Claude Prothée
- Directed by: Jacky Bretaudeau; Luc Vinciguerra
- Opening theme: Martin Morning Theme Song
- Ending theme: Martin Morning Theme Song (Instrumental)
- Composers: Didier Riey; Gérald Roberts
- Countries of origin: France; China
- Original language: French
- No. of seasons: 4
- No. of episodes: 156

Production
- Executive producer: Les Cartooneurs Associés
- Running time: 15 minutes
- Production company: Les Cartooneurs Associés

Original release
- Network: France 3
- Release: 25 August 2003 – 21 October 2018

Martin Morning (French: Martin Matin) is a French animated television series created by Denis Olivieri, Claude Prothée, Luc Vinciguerra, and Jacky Bretaudeau, produced by Les Cartooneurs Associés and animated by the Shanghai Jingri Animation Company.

== Synopsis ==
Martin, an ordinary nine-year-old boy, has one strange characteristic: every morning he awakes to find himself transformed into fantastic and legendary beings – a Merlin-like wizard, a pharaoh, a caveman, a vampire, a superhero, and many more transformations. Despite the transformations, he goes to school with his friends, and adventures then ensue.

== Characters ==
- Martin Morning, the title character, is an otherwise ordinary nine-year-old boy, who finds himself transformed every morning into extraordinary forms.
- Gromo is Martin's best friend and, despite Martin's misgivings, the biggest fan of his transformations and the subsequent adventures.
- Roxanne is the top of Gromo and Martin's primary school class. She is Martin's love interest, she participates in Martin's transformation adventures even though, sometimes, she doesn't like it when Martin transforms. In season 2, she doesn't get upset with Martin very often.
- Mr. Grinsle is the assistant principal of Martin's school, and believes Martin to be a menace, due to his transformations. He believes Mr. Pickle is too soft on the students, particularly Martin, and wishes to take his place as principal.
- Mr. Pickle is the principal of Martin's School.
- Toughy, a school bully who always bullies Martin and his friends.
- Nat, a red-haired girl from season 2 episode, "Martin Leads The Investigation".

== Episodes ==
=== Season 1 ===
1. Mighty Dragon Martin
2. Martin's Dog Day
3. Super Martin
4. Martin Multiplied
5. His Majesty Martin
6. Cro-Magnon Martin
7. Martin is Missing
8. Martin's Space Odyssey
9. Charming Martin
10. Magic Martin
11. Agent Martin 008
12. Little Miss Martin
13. Ancient Egyptian Martin
14. A Good Little Devil
15. Martin Megastar
16. Martin's Prehistoric Pal
17. Martin Musketeer
18. Mac Martin Mac Morning
19. Mini Martin
20. Sherlock Martin
21. Martin's Magic Lamp
22. Mechanical Martin
23. Martin And His Merry Men
24. Martin's Magic Potion
25. Lion Tamer Martin
26. Martin's Unlucky Day
27. Middle Aged Martin
28. The Amazing Mister M
29. The Talking Key
30. Martin's Dangerous Liaisons
31. Zen Master Martin
32. Ahoy Matey Martin
33. Fireman Martin
34. Martin Knight
35. The Lonesome Cowboy
36. Did You Say Normal?
37. Martin The Swami
38. Martin On The Lam
39. Voyage To The Edge Of The World
40. Martin Meets A Moonatic
41. No Pictures Please
42. Martin Meets An Evil Elf
43. Martin Saves Santa
44. The Lucky Duckling
45. Send In The Clown
46. Zeus Puts Martin To The Test
47. A Sucker For Soccer
48. Martin, Son Of Frankenstein
49. General Martinus Or: When In Rome...
50. Trouble In Toy Paradise
51. Snow Man In The Sauna
52. Martin Stops A Meteorite

=== Season 2 ===
1. The Joke's On Grindsel
2. Oh The Crocodiles!
3. Martin And The Mermaid
4. Martin Leads The Investigation
5. Good Morning Fairy Martin
6. Martin The Invisible
7. Martin The Alchimist
8. Martin Sioux Chief
9. Martin The Reporter
10. Martin The Know-it-all
11. Martin The Court Jester
12. Martin Favors His Left
13. Upside Down And Backwards
14. The Balladeer From Yesteryear
15. It "Was" A Dog's Life!
16. Good Morning Tarzan
17. Martin The Good Prince
18. All Smiles For Martin
19. Martin Has A Future
20. What An Odyssee
21. Good Soldier Martin
22. Good Morning Tarzan
23. The Magic Chef's Hat
24. Beware Of The Mummies
25. Martin's Afraid Of Nothing
26. Craziness In The Galaxy

=== Season 3 ===
1. The Iceberg Thief
2. Abracadabrax's Lost Illusions
3. Martin and the Inflatables
4. It's In The Cake!
5. Chef's Cook-Off
6. Martin On his Game
7. Principal Martin Reports To Work
8. Scarecrow has a Field day
9. Martin Talks to the Animals
10. Ali Martin
11. Smooth Glide for Martin
12. Gorilla on the loose!
13. Doctor Martin, laugh therapist
14. Captain Martin Martinus
15. Martin Busy Bee
16. Martin is Frank
17. Pipo and Pipo
18. The Treasure of Shipsink Island
19. Martin Super Racer
20. Planet of the Dogs
21. Martin Green Thumb
22. Martin, Master of Invention
23. Martin Strikes Gold
24. Professor Martin, Ufologist
25. The Zillionaire
26. The Ogre of Castle Hill

=== Season 4 ===
1. Dragon Shenanigans
2. Full Moon Madness
3. Lions, Tigers and Penguins, oh my
4. Martin and Loki the Vicking
5. Magic Martin
6. Martin the President's Mechanic
7. Martin's Fairytale
8. Space Martin
9. Martin Know-it-all
10. Captain Martin
11. Martin's Valentine Day
12. Martin the Oceanographer
13. Unexpected Treasure
14. Mini Martin
15. Martin the Privateer
16. Who you gonna Call
17. Ready for Takeoff
18. Lucky Martin
19. Morpheus's Perfume
20. Martin the Geek
21. Martin and the Creature of the Lake
22. Martin and the Beanstalk
23. Martin, Messenger of the Gods
24. Tiki Tiki Martin
25. Martin and the Monkey
26. Martin Da Vinci
27. Martin, Keeper of the Peace
28. Save Franny
29. Martin Crusoe
30. The Magic Baton
31. Martin and the Lost Pharaoh
32. Martin of the Round Table
33. The Black Mask
34. Robot Planet
35. A Prehistoric Adventure
36. Martin against the Zarglons
37. Martin and the Muse of the Museum
38. Martin sings a Different Tune
39. Buffeting is no Game
40. Martin and the Miminotaur
41. Martin the Good Witch
42. Martin and the Pot of Gold
43. Martin and the Drip Drop of the Sewers
44. A Shepherdess's Story
45. The Monkey King's Tao
46. The Savant Elephant
47. The Mischievous Circus
48. Morning, Martin Morning
49. Martin the Magician
50. Martin Puss Puss
51. As you Wish
52. Martin the Lumberjack
