= Murder of Marea Yann =

2003 murder in Healesville, Australia

Marea Yann
- Died: Healesville, Victoria, Australia
- Cause of death: Homicide
- Occupations: retired nurse and charity worker

Marea Bambina Alice Yann was an Australian nurse and charity shop worker who was murdered on 30 September 2003.

The murder remains unsolved. A $1 million reward is currently being offered to anyone who provides information which leads to a person being convicted of Yann's murder.

Yann's former son-in-law Joseph (James) Unumadu was charged with her murder in February 2006 but was acquitted when he was found not guilty by a jury after a two-week Supreme Court trial in February 2008. He continues to maintain his innocence.

== Background ==
Yann was known for her charity work. She volunteered at an opportunity shop and had helped reformed alcoholics and drug addicts.

Yann moved to the Victorian town of Healesville in 1995 after having moved from Acheron, and had recently retired from her work at the charity store located on the Maroondah Highway. She had been a widow for twenty years prior to her death, following the death of her husband in 1984.

== Murder ==
Yann's body was discovered in an armchair at her Juliet Crescent home by her gardener at approximately 9:00 AM on 30 September 2003. Her last known contact with a family member was a telephone call with her daughter in Queensland at approximately 9:30pm on 29 September 2003.

No weapon was found at the scene but an autopsy revealed her death was caused by significant injuries to her upper body. Her murder took place just weeks before she was due to celebrate her 70th birthday in November 2003.

Yann's son Jeff Yann was critical of the way extensive resources had been deployed to resolve the Melbourne gangland killings while his mother's murder remained unsolved. He said if his mother's murder investigation had been better funded, it may have led to an expeditious arrest of his mother's killer.

In 2005, Yann's family issued a $100,000 reward in the hope the killer would be brought to justice. At that time, Detective Acting Inspector Jeff Maher said the community should be outraged at Yann's murder considering her community work and the fact she didn't appear to have any enemies.

== Inquest ==
An inquest into Yann's death was held at the Coroners Court of Victoria in February 2006. During the inquest, it was revealed Victoria Police suspected her former son-in-law Joseph (James) Unumadu.

Unumadu was a sheet metal worker who had migrated to Australia from Nigeria in 1976, marrying Yann's daughter Pauline five years later.

The inquest was told a purported witch doctor in Nigeria was contacted by Unumadu two months before Yann's murder. According to a witness, Yann had told her that Unumadu had handed her his mobile phone while driving and told her that his witch doctor was on the line. According to the witness, the witch doctor then told Yann that something terrible would happen within seven days’ time.

The coroner was also told during the inquest that Unumadu had manhandled and harassed Yann in the months leading up to her death. Pauline Yann told the inquest that while her mother once had a struggle with Unuamdu, she had never feared for her life. Yann's son Jeff Yann told the inquest that Unumadu had threatened his mother with a knife months before she was killed.

A forensic scientist who attended the murder scene said Yann had been repeatedly struck more than 20 times in a quick series of blows that had left a large amount of blood splattered throughout the loungeroom. When her body was found, the television was still on and the security door was unlocked.

Unumadu refused to give evidence during the inquest on the grounds that he might incriminate himself.

== Arrest and trial ==
Unumadu was then arrested and charged with Yann's murder on 8 February 2006 and remanded in custody. After Unumadu's arrest, Yann's son Jeff Yann thanked the Victorian Homicide Squad for their "diligence" and "faith".

A two-week trial was held at the Supreme Court of Victoria in February 2008.

During the trial, police alleged Unumadu killed Yann after she took her daughter's side after her marriage with Unumado broke down. A witness during the trial claimed Unumado had confessed to murdering Yann and boasted that the police had no evidence to prove that he did it.

Evidence pertaining to Unumadu using his witch doctor to allegedly intimidate Yann was banned by Justice Betty King, as was evidence relating to alleged death threats which was deemed too prejudicial.

After five hours of deliberations, the Supreme Court jury found Unumadu not guilty of Yann's murder.

Yann's family was frustrated that hearsay evidence was unable to be heard by the jury. This included allegations that Unumado had threatened to kill Yann, and Jeff Yann's claim that his mother had told her Unumadu had assaulted her by grabbing her around the throat. The prompted Yann's family to lobby the Victorian Government to quickly pass proposed new laws regarding the admissibility of hearsay evidence during murder trials.

An associate professor at the University of Melbourne's law school said that while there could be no guarantee, the proposed changed could have potentially enabled the jury to hear evidence of Unumadu's alleged assault on Yann and his alleged threats to kill Yann.

Yann's daughter Ronda Chagoury said she hoped the proposed changes could spare other families from the "shocking" ordeal hers had gone through.

In 2021, Yann's sister Deanne Green said she had always been "bewildered" by the fact that so much of "a very good case" had to be thrown out due to the inadmissibility of hearsay evidence.

Unumadu continues to maintain his innocence. In a newspaper article in The Australian, he is quoted as saying: "For years I was persecuted for a vile murder I did not commit... I spent two years of my life in remand, while the police and members of the family smeared my name. On Google, my name remains as the suspect. I am innocent and the police needed to look elsewhere but didn't."

== Review ==
In September 2021, Victoria Police announced it would review the case.

This followed an interview on 3AW in which Detective Inspector Tim Day told Neil Mitchell that he would like to see Marea Yann's murder solved before he retires. Describing the murder as "solvable", Day said Yann's murder always comes back to him.

A Victoria Police spokesperson that the cold case was in the process of being reviewed "in line with current investigation practices and in light of changes to legislation." If new and compelling evidence is brought to light, a person could now be charged with the same crime a second time due to changes to double jeopardy laws.

In May 2023, Victoria Police announced a $1 million reward for anyone who provides information that leads to a person being convicted for Yann's murder.

== Television documentary ==
In May 2023, it was announced a television documentary entitled Who killed Marea?, hosted by Denham Hitchcock, would be aired on Sky News Australia on 17 May 2023, which would investigate the circumstances surrounding Yann's death.
