= Justice Action =

Australian not-for-profit organization

- Founded: 1979
- Founder: Brett Collins
- Type: Community organisation
- Purpose: Prison reform, criminal justice, mental health
- Location: Trades Hall, Suite 204, 4 Goulburn St, Sydney NSW 2000, Australia
- Region served: Australia
- Website: justiceaction.org.au
- Formerly called: Prisoner Action

Justice Action is an Australian not-for-profit community organisation based in Sydney. The organisation advocates for the rights of people involved in the criminal justice and mental health systems, with a particular focus on abuses of authority. Founded in 1979 as Prisoner Action, Justice Action operates independently of the Australian government and is funded through voluntary donations and its associated social enterprise, Breakout Media Communications.

The organisation's coordinator is Brett Collins, a former prisoner who co-founded the organisation in 1979. Justice Action is supported by a team of university interns, primarily students studying law and related disciplines.

== Campaigns and activities ==
In operation since 1979, Justice Action is one of the oldest independent prisoners' rights and advocacy organisations in Australia, and has played a significant role in the development of national criminal justice policy. It was instrumental in establishing various other advocacy bodies, including the Prisoners Legal Service in 1979, following the Nagle Royal Commission into New South Wales Prisons, and the Australian Prisoners Union in 1999.

Justice Action provides ongoing case-by-case support to prisoners and involuntary mental health patients, particularly in matters involving abuse, mistreatment, or violations of human rights. The organisation has led high-profile campaigns on issues such as prison education and computer access for inmates, visitation rights for women prisoners, the right of prisoners to vote, the implementation of prison-based needle and syringe programs, and the rights of involuntary mental health patients to access education and make decisions about their treatment.

Justice Action is regularly invited to present at conferences in Australia and internationally on topics including prison reform, prisoners' rights, and mental health policy.

As a community organisation focused on human rights within the justice and mental health sectors, Justice Action collaborates with national and international partners to share information, conduct research, and coordinate advocacy campaigns. In Australia, it works in conjunction with other community groups and peak bodies such as the New South Wales Council of Social Services, the New South Wales Teachers Federation, and is a member of the Community Justice Coalition, an Australian coalition dedicated to justice and prison reform.

Internationally, Justice Action is a member of the International Conference on Penal Abolition (ICOPA), a biennial global forum for activists and scholars. In 2006, the organisation hosted ICOPA XI in Tasmania.

== Publications ==
Justice Action publishes research and policy papers on issues related to criminal justice reform and mental health policy.

Until 2004, the organisation published a quarterly newspaper titled Framed. Spanning 44 issues, Framed was Australia’s only inmate-run newspaper, featuring edited contributions from incarcerated individuals across the country. The publication was distributed to prisons nationwide.

In 2002, Framed was banned from distribution in New South Wales prisons by Corrective Services NSW (CSNSW), which claimed that the content could incite “disharmony and conflict” within correctional facilities. Justice Action challenged the ban by filing a complaint with the Human Rights and Equal Opportunity Commission (HREOC). The Commission concluded that the ban was not supported by adequate evidence and likely constituted a violation of the human rights of federal prisoners. Although HREOC recommended that the ban be overturned, CSNSW declined to act on the recommendation, stating it had "no intention of taking any action".

In 2012, Justice Action released several research papers on topics including restorative justice, cognitive behavioural therapy, remission, and the use of computers in prison cells. These papers were launched at the 14th International Conference on Penal Abolition (ICOPA 14), held in Trinidad and Tobago.

== See also ==
- Human rights abuses
- Incarceration
- Involuntary commitment
- Involuntary treatment
- Judicial system
- Mental health in Australia
- Prisoner abuse
