= Inside Australia =

2003 Australian television series

Inside Australia is a former weekly Australian television documentary series, produced and broadcast by the Special Broadcasting Service between 2003 and 2008.

== History ==
Inside Australia premiered on SBS Television at 7:00 pm on Sunday 12 October 2003 The first season was 12 episodes long, with SBS working with directors to depict normal Australians.

The show was axed in 2008, concluding on 29 October with a re-airing of My Brother Vinnie.

== Description ==
Episodes were 25 minutes long and the series was designed to look at "personal stories of Australians and topical issues in contemporary Australian life." Film makers were asked to submit proposals and SBS would help fund production of chosen works.

It featured documentaries on many different subjects, varying from stand-alone documentaries to continuing series. Documentaries aired include:

- Hard Choices over eight episodes about "difficult decisions everyday Australians face in their lives".
- The Passionate Apprentices, three episodes about specialist craftsmen passing on their knowledge to apprentices.
- Over the Fence, four episodes about neighbours.
- My Brother Vinnie which sees actor Aaron Pedersen caring for his disabled brother Vinnie.
- The Godfather of Bodies about a former body builder training women in the sport.
- Grandpa's Games on a 91 year old sportsman.

== See also ==
- List of Australian television series
