= Belinda Luscombe =

- Born: Sydney, Australia
- Occupations: Editor-at-large, Time magazine
- Years active: 2008–
- Spouse: Jeremy Edmiston (m. 1991)

Belinda Luscombe (born in Sydney) is an Australian-born journalist, and author of the book Marriageology: The Art and Science of Staying Together (Spiegel & Grau 2019). She is editor-at-large at Time magazine, and served as Time's arts editor 2003–2008, thus directing all of Time's cultural coverage. She joined the magazine as a staff writer in 1995 and became a senior editor in 1999. Cover stories she edited include "The Last Star Wars" (May 2005) and "Has TV Gone Too Far?" (March 2005). After switching to writing, she authored cover stories on Sheryl Sandberg, Gretchen Carlson, marriage, pornography, grief and parents who lost children to gun violence. She also was editor of the first U.S. issue of Time Style & Design (February 2003). Since 2008, she has been an editor-at-large, specializing in high profile interviews, including cover stories on Jacinda Ardern, Melinda Gates, Snoop Dogg, Elton John, Bob Iger, and Mr. Beast. Her interview with Chris Kyle is TIME's most-watched interview on YouTube.

She has written humorous essays on interfacial marriage, how Warren Buffett should fix bras and revoking Larry King's marriage license. In 2010, she won the Council on Contemporary Families Media Award for Print coverage of Family Issues.

She holds a B.A. in English literature and a Diploma of Education from the University of Sydney, and began her journalism career at the Daily Telegraph in Sydney. She has also written for New York, Sports Illustrated, Fortune, Mademoiselle, The New York Times, Travel & Leisure, Vogue and Vogue Australia, Who (Australia), Arena (UK), and the South China Morning Post (Hong Kong), and has contributed humorous essays to several books.

== Bibliography ==
- Luscombe, Belinda (2019). Marriageology : the art and science of staying together. Spiegel & Grau.
- — (2–9 March 2020). "Jacinda Ardern's next big test". Time Magazine. 195 (7–8) (International ed.): 20–27. (Note: Online version is titled "A year after Christchurch, Jacinda Ardern has the world’s attention. How will she use it?".)

———————
