= You Can't Stop the Murders =

- Theatrical release poster
- Directed by: Anthony Mir
- Written by: Anthony Mir
- Produced by: Anastasia Sideris
- Starring: Anthony Mir; Gary Eck; Akmal Saleh; Richard Carter; Kirstie Hutton; Rob Carlton
- Cinematography: Justin Brickle
- Music by: Jamie Fonti
- Distributed by: Miramax Films (through Buena Vista International)
- Release date: 2003
- Running time: 100 minutes
- Country: Australia
- Languages: English, French

You Can't Stop the Murders is a 2003 Australian comedy film directed by Anthony Mir and written by and starring Mir, Gary Eck and Akmal Saleh. The plot revolves around a series of Village People-themed murders in a small town, and the police who investigate the crimes. The title is a satirical reference to the 1980 film Can't Stop the Music, in which the Village People star.

== Plot ==
Eck and Saleh play two police constables in a rural village, 'Gary' and 'Akmal' who lead fairly unremarkable lives. Gary's main aim is to be crowned line dancing champion of the village, having always been the runner-up. A series of horrific murders, involving the mutilation of bodies, rock the town, and 'Tony' (Mir), a detective from the city, is called in reluctantly to investigate. Whilst the young Akmal is in awe of the dashing detective, Tony's aggressive methods clash with the uptight Gary, and 'Chief Carter' (Richard Carter), the officer in charge of the station. Tony is eventually sent back to the city, after shooting a French male stripper.

Gary and Akmal soon discover that the murders have a Village People theme, with those murdered having been in one of the occupations of a Village Person, or resembling one. They fearfully deduce that either a policeman or a dentist (Akmal is uncertain, as he does not clearly remember the Village People, although Gary quickly deduces that it is, in fact, a policeman) will be next to die, as does Tony, who rushes back from the city.

== Cast ==
- Gary Eck as Gary
- Akmal Saleh as Akmal
- Anthony Mir as Tony
- Richard Carter as Chief Carter
- Jason Clarke as Slade
- Jimeoin as Burrito
- Kitty Flanagan as Berryl
- Rob Carlton as Barry
- Bob Franklin
- The Umbilical Brothers
- Garry Who as Trevor
- Haskel Daniel
- The Dickster
- Rash Ryder
- Kenny Graham
- The Sandman

== Box office ==
You Can't Stop the Murders grossed $254,871 at the box office in Australia.

== See also ==
- Cinema of Australia
