= Gary Eck =

Australian comedian and actor

- Born: Gary Eck; Australia

Comedy career
- Years active: 1990's - present
- Medium: film / television director, writer and actor; stand-up comedy
- Website: http://www.garyeck.com/

Gary Eck is an Australian comedian and actor.

== Early life and education ==
Gary Eck grew up in Canberra. He attended Latham Primary School, Belconnen High School, and Hawker College.

== Career ==
Gary Eck has starred in several Australian movies, including 2003's You Can't Stop The Murders (which he had written for as well) and The Night We Called It A Day, and also in 2006's BoyTown. Eck has also appeared in several short films.

In 2007, Eck appeared as himself on a regular basis on The Nation, a television show that aired on Channel Nine (alongside Mick Molloy as host).

Eck has done comedy on several shows, including Good News Week, Joker Poker and The Footy Show. One of Eck's performances at Sydney's Comedy Store is the basis for his stand-up CD, Gary Eck Live!

In 2010, Eck, alongside George Miller, wrote a screenplay for Happy Feet Two. The film was released on 18 November 2011. He also provided additional voices.

== Awards ==
=== ARIA Music Awards ===
The ARIA Music Awards are a set of annual ceremonies presented by Australian Recording Industry Association (ARIA), which recognise excellence, innovation, and achievement across all genres of the music of Australia. They commenced in 1987.

Year	Nominee / work	Award	Result	Ref.
2004	The Hollywood Motel (with Lee Perry)	Best Comedy Release	Nominated	
