= Top Blokes Foundation =

Australian non-governmental organisation

The Top Blokes Foundation is an Australian-based non-government organisation that addresses young men’s health outcomes and provides social education programs to young men and boys. Founded in 2006, Top Blokes Foundation has worked with Australian young men to improve their behaviour, wellbeing and their relationship with schools and communities.

== History ==
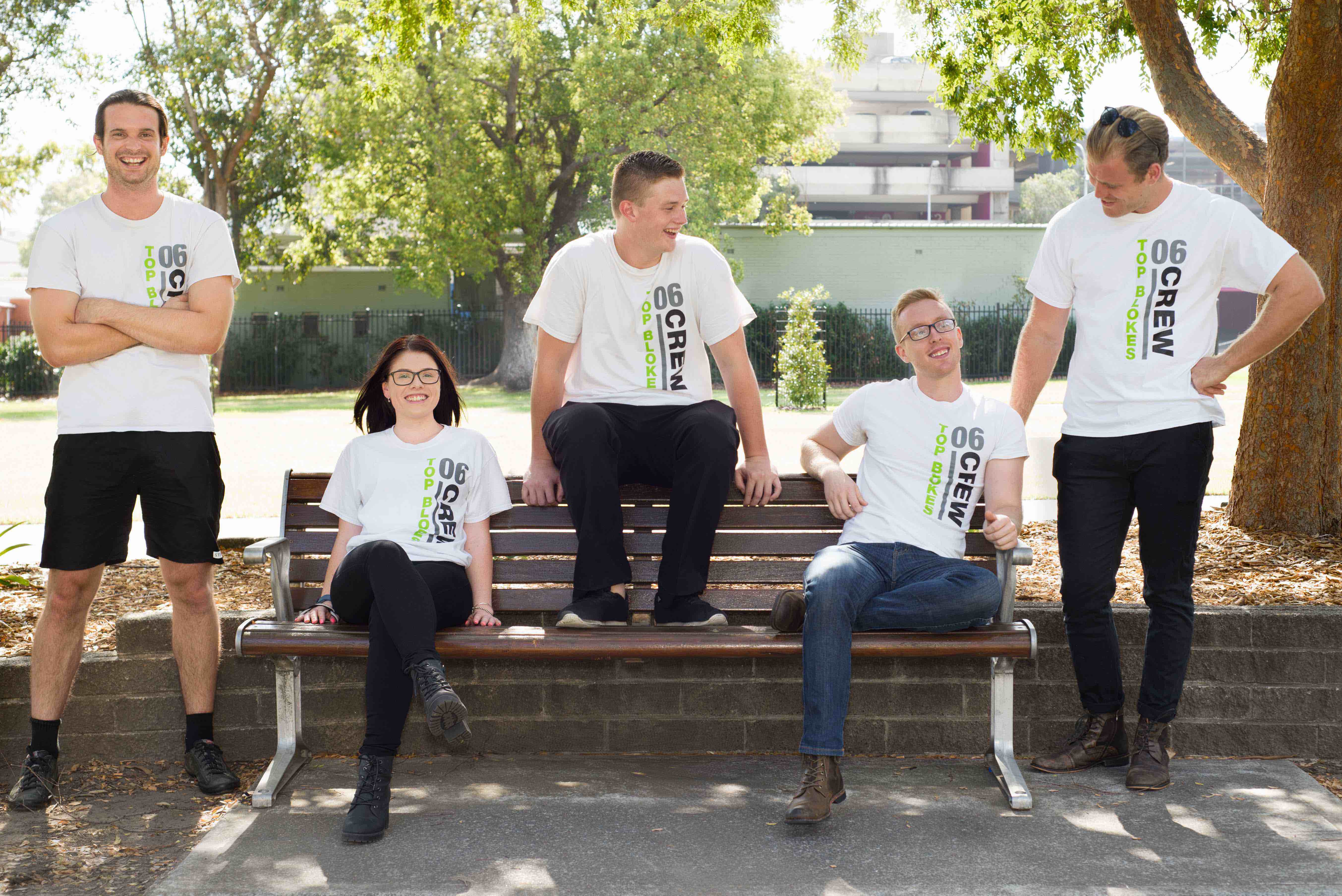
Top Blokes Foundation Youth Workers

Top Blokes Foundation was founded in Wollongong, New South Wales, by Melissa Abu-Gazaleh in 2006. After receiving a youth change grant from Foundation for Young Australians, the Top Blokes Foundation was registered as a non-government organisation and began hosting award programs to promote volunteerism by young males.

In 2012, the Top Blokes Foundation established mentoring programs to address the health outcomes of young males and delivers long-term mentoring programs in schools and communities.

In 2015, the Top Blokes Foundation joined the Safe Schools Coalition – a national campaign to reduce homophobia and transphobia in Australian schools and later that year, Abu-Gazaleh was awarded NSW Young Australian of the Year and Illawarra Entrepreneur of the Year.

== Addressing Young Male Health Issues ==
The below statistics underpins the Top Blokes Foundation rationale for focusing on young male health:

• Suicide is the leading cause of death for males 15–24 years;

• One in four teenagers have experienced an unwanted sexual encounter;

• 75% of mental health problems emerge before the age of 25;

• Young men are three times more likely to die in an accident than young women

• The average age young men view pornographic material is 11 years old;

• 90 people died from one punch assaults between 2000 and 2013.

== Mission and programs ==
The Top Blokes Foundation's mission is to foster the inclusion, build the resilience and ensure the well-being of Australian young males. The foundation aims to achieve this mission through four core programs.

Junior Top Blokes Mentoring Program

A 16-week boys mentoring program delivered by Youth Workers in schools for boys aged 14–17. This program was developed in 2011 to address the growing trend of negative risk taking and antisocial behaviours often associated with young men. Topics this program addresses includes:

• Alcohol and Other Drugs;

• Mental Health;

• Sexting and Online Behaviour;

• Anger management;

• Sexuality;

• Leadership.

Building Blokes

An 8-week mentoring program for young males who experience unemployment and other social barriers to achieving health. The program allows men who participate to volunteer off their unpaid fines with the NSW Office of State Revenue.

Public Education

This program provides education to the community on issues impacting young male health.

These presentations for parents, teachers, educators and young people utilises current research, Top Blokes Foundation experiences, program evaluations and case studies to educate and empower the audience through presentations and interactive workshops.

National Boy's Health Forum

This annual forum is the Top Blokes Foundation's key advocacy platform and features key researchers, practitioners and advocates who present on emerging social issues affecting young males health and well-being. The 2015 National Health Forum featured speakers including His Excellency General The Honourable David Hurley, Dr Jo River, Melissa Abu-Gazaleh and Top Blokes Foundation Youth Ambassadors.
