= List of people legally executed in Victoria =

This is a list of people executed in Victoria. It lists people who were executed by British (and from 1901, Australian) authorities within the modern-day boundaries of Victoria. For people executed in other parts of Australia, see the sidebar.

== 1840s ==
- Tunnerminnerwait – Hanged at Melbourne on 20 January 1842 for the murder of two whalers at Cape Paterson
- Maulboyheenner – Hanged at Melbourne on 20 January 1842 for the murder of two whalers at Cape Paterson
- Charles Ellis – Hanged at Melbourne Gaol on 28 June 1842 for "shooting with intent to maim or disable" ("The Plenty Trio")
- Martin Fogarty – Bushranger. Hanged at Melbourne Gaol on 28 June 1842 for "shooting with intent to maim or disable" ("The Plenty Trio")
- Daniel ("Yankee Jack") Jepps – Bushranger. Hanged at Melbourne Gaol on 28 June 1842 for "shooting with intent to maim or disable" ("The Plenty Trio")
- Alkepurata ("Roger") – 5 September 1842 – From Port Fairy. Hanged at Melbourne for murder of Patrick Codd at Mount Rouse, Hamilton
- Jeremiah Connell – 27 January 1847 – Hanged at Melbourne Gaol for the murder of Edward Martin at Buninyong
- Bobby – 30 April 1847 – Hanged at Melbourne Gaol for the killing by spear of Andrew Beveridge at Piangil
- Ptolemy – 30 April 1847 – Hanged at Melbourne Gaol for the killing by spear of Andrew Beveridge at Piangil
- John ("Pretty Boy") Healey – 29 November 1847 – Hanged at Melbourne Gaol for the murder of Jemmy Ritchie at Tarraville, Gippsland
- Augustus Dancey 19 – 1 August 1848 – Hanged at Melbourne Gaol for the murder of Matthew Luck at Stony Creek (Spotswood)

== 1850s ==
=== 1850 to 1854 ===
- Patrick Kennedy – 1 October 1851 – Hanged at Melbourne Gaol for the murder of his wife Mary at Penshurst
- James Barlow – 22 May 1852 – Hanged at Melbourne Gaol for murder by stabbing William Jones at a boarding house in Flinders Street, Melbourne
- John Riches (Richie) – 3 November 1852 – Hanged at Melbourne Gaol for the murder of Harry Webb in the Black Forest, near Macedon
- George Pinkerton – 4 April 1853 – Hanged at Melbourne Gaol for the murder of Bridget Smith, 8 months pregnant, and her one-year-old son Charles at Brighton
- Aaron Durant – 11 July 1853 – Hanged at Melbourne Gaol for robbery with violence and sexual assault of Mr & Mrs John Wright at Bendigo
- John Smith – 23 August 1853 – Hanged at Melbourne Gaol for Robbery With Violence at Fryer's Creek
- Henry Turner – 23 August 1853 – Hanged at Melbourne Gaol for Robbery With Violence at Fryer's Creek
- William Atkins (or Atkyns) – 3 October 1853 – Bushranger. Hanged at Melbourne Gaol for the robbery of the Private Escort, near Kalkallo
- George ("Frenchy") Melville – 3 October 1853 – Bushranger. Hanged at Melbourne Gaol for the robbery of the Private Escort
- George Wilson – 3 October 1853 – Bushranger. Hanged at Melbourne Gaol for the robbery of an Escort
- Patrick O'Connor (or Connor) – 24 October 1853 – Bushranger. Hanged at Melbourne Gaol for the attempted murder of Edward Thompson near Kilmore
- Henry Bradley – 24 October 1853 – Bushranger. Hanged at Melbourne Gaol for the attempted murder of Edward Thompson near Kilmore
- Michael Fennessy – 25 October 1853 – Hanged at Melbourne Gaol for murder of his wife Eliza Fennessy off Little Bourke Street
- Alexander Ram – 25 October 1853 – Hanged at Melbourne Gaol for the murder of Kitty Finessy at Prahran
- John Smith – 25 November 1853 – Hanged at Melbourne Gaol for being accessory to rape of Mary-Ann Brown on the Goulburn River Diggings
- Joseph West – 27 December 1853 – Hanged at Melbourne Gaol for rape of eight-year-old Elizabeth Fraser near Chewton
- James Button – 28 March 1854 – Bushranger. Hanged at Melbourne Gaol for Shooting With Intent on the Goulburn River Diggings
- David Magee – 25 April 1854 – Hanged at Melbourne Gaol for murder of a man named McCarthy on the Avoca River
- William Thoroughgood – 23 May 1854 – Hanged at Melbourne Gaol for the rape of seven-year-old Sarah Bishop
- John Hughes – 25 September 1854 – Hanged at Melbourne Gaol for the murder of Abraham Marcus at Yackandandah
- John Gunn – 9 November 1854 – Hanged at Geelong Gaol for the murder of Samuel Harris at Warrnambool
- George (John) Roberts – 9 November 1854 – Hanged at Geelong for attempting to poison George Kelly at Native Hut Creek, near Inverleigh
- Luke Lucas – 24 November 1854 – Hanged for murder of his wife Mary off Little Bourke Street

=== 1855 to 1859 ===
- James McAlister – 25 July 1855 – Hanged at Melbourne Gaol for murder of Jane Jones at the Exchange Hotel, Swanston Street, Melbourne
- James Condon (alias Arthur Somerville) – 24 November 1855 – Bushranger. Hanged at Melbourne Gaol for Robbery With Violence near Bacchus Marsh
- John Dixon – 24 November 1855 – Bushranger. Hanged at Melbourne Gaol for Robbery With Violence near Bacchus Marsh
- Alfred Henry Jackson – 24 November 1855 – Bushranger. Hanged at Melbourne Gaol for Robbery With Violence near Bacchus Marsh
- James Ross (alias Griffiths) – 22 April 1856 – Hanged at Geelong Gaol for the murder of his son and Eliza Sayer near Horsham
- William Twigham (or Twiggem, alias Lexton) – 11 March 1857 – Hanged at Melbourne Gaol for the murder of Sergeant John McNally at the Cathcart Diggings, near Ararat
- Chu-Ah-Luk 30 – 2 March 1857 – Hanged at Melbourne Gaol for the murder of Ah Pat at Campbell's Creek
- James Cornick – 16 March 1857 – Hanged at Melbourne Gaol for murder of Agnes McCallum (Horne) at Eaglehawk
- Frederick Turner 22 – 27 April 1857 – Bushranger. Hanged at Melbourne Gaol for Robbery Under Arms on the Flemington Road
- Thomas Williams – 28 April 1857 – Hanged at Melbourne Gaol for his part in the murder of Inspector-General John Giles Price
- Henry Smith (alias Brennan) – 28 April 1857 – Hanged at Melbourne Gaol for his part in the murder of Inspector-General John Giles Price
- Thomas Moloney – 28 April 1857 – Hanged at Melbourne Gaol for his part in the murder of Inspector-General John Giles Price
- Francis Brannigan – 29 April 1857 – Hanged at Melbourne Gaol for his part in the murder of Inspector-General John Giles Price
- William Brown – 29 April 1857 – Hanged at Melbourne Gaol for his part in the murder of Inspector-General John Giles Price
- Richard Bryant – 29 April 1857 – Hanged at Melbourne Gaol for his part in the murder of Inspector-General John Giles Price
- John Chisley – 30 April 1857 – Hanged at Melbourne Gaol for his part in the murder of Inspector-General John Giles Price
- James Woodlock – 1 June 1857 – Hanged at Melbourne Gaol for murder of Charles Vick in Castlemaine
- Chong Sigh – 3 September 1857 – Hanged at Melbourne Gaol for murder of Sophia "The Chinawoman" Lewis in a brothel in Stephen Street (Exhibition Street) Melbourne
- Hing Tzan – 3 September 1857 – Hanged at Melbourne Gaol for murder of Sophia Lewis in a brothel in Stephen Street (Exhibition Street) Melbourne
- John Mason – 6 November 1857 – Hanged at Melbourne Gaol for murder of "Big George" Beynor at Ballan
- Edward Brown – 1 March 1858 – Hanged at Melbourne Gaol for Robbery With Violence at Ararat Racecourse
- William Jones – 1 March 1858 – Hanged at Melbourne Gaol for Robbery With Violence at Ararat Racecourse
- George Robinson – 16 March 1858 – Hanged for the murder of Margaret Brown at Maryborough
- Edward Cardana (alias John Nelson alias Michael Ferrara) – 19 March 1858 – Hanged at Bendigo for the murder of John Armstrong at Long Gully
- Owen McQueeny – 20 October 1858 – Hanged at Geelong for the murder of Elizabeth Lowe near Meredith ("The Green Tent Murder")
- Samuel Gibbs – 12 November 1858 – Hanged at Melbourne Gaol for the murder of his wife Anne at Ararat. This execution was botched; the rope snapped tumbling Gibbs to the floor. He had to be carried back up the scaffold and hanged again with a fresh rope.
- George Thompson – 12 November 1858 – Hanged at Melbourne Gaol for the murder of Hugh Anderson at Ballarat
- Edward Hitchcock – 29 November 1858 – Hanged at Melbourne Gaol for the murder of his wife Ann at Strathloddon, near Campbell's Creek. This execution was also botched; Hitchcock failed to die and remained struggling on the rope. The executioner had to grab Hitchcock by the knees and use his weight to ensure death.
- Christian Von Sie (or Von See) – 29 November 1858 – Hanged at Melbourne Gaol for the murder of Martin Loemann near Mitiamo
- Thomas Ryan – 11 April 1859 – Hanged at Melbourne Gaol for the murder of Joe Hartwig in the Indigo Valley
- William ("Plaguey Billy") Armstrong – 12 July 1859 – Hanged at Melbourne Gaol for shooting with intent, Omeo
- George ("The Butcher") Chamberlain 24 – 12 July 1859 – Hanged at Melbourne Gaol for shooting with intent, Omeo
- Richard Rowley – 26 July 1859 – Hanged at Melbourne Gaol for violent assault with intent to murder his overseers at the Pentridge Stockade
- William Siddons – 7 November 1859 – Hanged at Melbourne Gaol for the rape of eight-year-old Mary-Anne Smith at Doctor's Creek, near Lexton
- Henry Brown – 21 November 1859 – Hanged for murder of George James Tickner at Mount Korong, near Wedderburn

== 1860s ==
=== 1860 to 1864 ===
- George Waines -16 July 1860 – Hanged at Melbourne Gaol for the murder of Mary Hunt at Casterton
- Edward Fenlow (alias Reynolds) – 20 August 1860 – Hanged at Melbourne Gaol for the murder of George Plummer (alias Gardiner) at Inglewood
- John McDonald – 30 September 1860 – Hanged at Melbourne Gaol for murder of his wife Sarah at Ironbark Gully, Bendigo
- William Smith – 22 April 1861 – Hanged at Melbourne Gaol for the murder of his wife Ellen near Wangaratta
- Henry Cooley – 11 July 1861 – Hanged at Melbourne Gaol for murder of his wife Harriet at Heathcote
- Nathaniel Horatio Ruby – 5 August 1861 – Hanged at Melbourne Gaol for the murder of Joe Watson at the Great Western Reef, Tarnagulla
- Martin Rice – 30 September 1861 – Hanged at Melbourne Gaol for the murder of Anthony Green off Bourke Street, Melbourne
- Thomas Sanders – 31 October 1861 – Hanged at Melbourne Gaol for the rape of Mary Egan at Keilor
- Samuel Pollett – 29 December 1862 – Hanged at Melbourne Gaol for the rape of his ten-year-old daughter Sarah at Prahran
- Thomas McGee – 19 February 1863 – Hanged at Melbourne Gaol for the murder of Alexander Brown at Maiden Gully
- James Murphy – 6 November 1863 – Hanged at Geelong for the murder of Senior Constable Daniel O'Boyle at Warrnambool
- Julian Cross – 11 November 1863 – From Macao. Hanged at Melbourne Gaol for the murder of Robert Scott in the Wappan district (near Mansfield)
- David Gedge – 11 November 1863 – Hanged at Melbourne Gaol for the murder of Robert Scott in the Wappan district (near Mansfield)
- Elizabeth Scott – 11 November 1863 – Hanged at Melbourne Gaol for the murder of her husband in the Wappan district (near Mansfield)
- James Barrett (also called Birmingham) – 1 December 1863 – Hanged at Melbourne Gaol for the murder of Elizabeth Beckinsale at Woodstock
- Alexander Davis – 29 February 1864 – Hanged at Ballarat Gaol for the murder of George Sims at Smythesdale
- William Carver (also called Thornby, Foster) – 3 August 1864 – Hanged at Melbourne Gaol for an attempted bank robbery at Fitzroy
- Samuel Woods (also called Abraham Salmonie) – 3 August 1864 – Hanged at Melbourne Gaol for Shooting With Intent in an attempted bank robbery at Fitzroy
- Christopher Harrison – 3 August 1864 – Hanged at Melbourne Gaol for the murder of James Marsh in William St.

=== 1865 to 1869 ===
- John Stacey (real name Casey) – 5 April 1865 – Hanged at Melbourne Gaol for the murder of two-year-old Danny Gleeson at South Melbourne
- Joseph ("Quiet Joe") Brown – 4 May 1865 – Hanged at Melbourne Gaol for the murder of Emmanuel "Dodger" Jacobs at the Whittington Tavern, Bourke Street Melbourne
- Peter Dotsalaere – 6 July 1865 – Hanged at Melbourne Gaol for the murder of Catherine Jacobs at 106 LaTrobe Street Melbourne
- David Young – 21 August 1865 – Hanged at Castlemaine Gaol for the murder of Margaret Graham at Daylesford
- Thomas ("Yankee Tom") Menard – 28 October 1865 – Hanged at Geelong for the murder of James Sweeney at Warrnambool
- Patrick Sheehan – 6 November 1865 – Hanged at Beechworth for the murder of James Kennedy at Rowdy Flat Yackandandah
- Long Poy – 10 March 1866 – Hanged at Castlemaine for the murder of Ah Yong at Emu Flat
- James Jones – 19 March 1866 – Hanged at Ballarat for the murder of Dr Julius Saenger, committed at Scarsdale
- Robert Bourke (alias Cluskey) – 29 November 1866 – Bushranger. Hanged at Melbourne Gaol for the murder of Harry Facey Hurst at Diamond Creek
- Denis Murphy – 16 April 1867 – Hanged at Ballarat for the murder of Patrick O'Meara at Bullarook
- John Kelly – 4 May 1867 – Hanged at Beechworth for sodomy on eighteen-month-old James Strack at Wangaratta
- William Terry – 31 July 1867 – Hanged at Castlemaine for the murder of a man named Peter Reddick or Redyk on the Coliban near Taradale
- George Searle – 7 August 1867 – Hanged at Ballarat for the murder of Thomas Burke at Piggoreet
- Joseph Ballan – 7 August 1867 – Hanged at Ballarat for the murder of Thomas Burke at Piggoreet
- Bernard Cunningham – 31 March 1868 – Confederate Army veteran. Hanged at Melbourne Gaol for the murder of John Fairweather at Green Gully, near Keilor
- Joseph Whelan – 31 March 1868 – Hanged at Melbourne Gaol for the murder of farmer Thomas Bramley at near Rokewood, Victoria.
- John Hogan – 14 August 1868 – Hanged at Castlemaine for the murder of Martin Rooney, committed at Bullock Creek, outside Marong
- Michael Flannigan (Flannagan) – 31 March 1869 – Hanged at Melbourne Gaol for the murder of Sgt Thomas Hull at Hamilton
- James Ritson – 3 August 1869 – Hanged at Melbourne Gaol for the murder of the Methodist Minister William Hill, who was visiting him at A Division, Pentridge
- Peter Higgins (alias James Smith) – 11 November 1869 – Hanged at Beechworth for the murder of his wife Elizabeth Wheelahan near Springhurst

== 1870s ==
- Ah Pew – 23 May 1870 – Hanged at Castlemaine for the murder of nine-year-old Elizabeth Hunt at Glenluce, near Vaughan
- Patrick Smith – 4 August 1870 – Hanged at Melbourne Gaol for the murder of his wife Mary at North Melbourne
- Andrew Vair (Vere) – 15 August 1870 – Hanged at Ararat for murder of Amos Cheale at St Arnaud
- James Cusack – 30 August 1870 – Hanged at Melbourne Gaol for the murder of his wife Anne at Woods Point
- James Seery – 14 November 1870 – Hanged at Melbourne Gaol for the murder of August Tepfar at Crooked River, Gippsland
- James Quinn – 10 November 1871 – Hanged at Beechworth for the murder of Ah Woo, near Myrtleford
- Patrick Geary – 4 December 1871 – Hanged at Melbourne Gaol for the murder of a shepherd named Thomas Brookhouse near Colac in 1854
- Edward Feeney – 14 May 1872 – Hanged at Melbourne Gaol for the murder of Charles Marks in the Treasury Gardens
- James Wilkie – 20 May 1872 – Hanged at Castlemaine for the murder of Henry Pensom at Daylesford
- Samuel Wright – 11 March 1873 – Hanged at Castlemaine for the attempted murder of Arthur Hagan (or Hogan) at Dead Horse Flat, near Eaglehawk
- Thomas Brady – 12 May 1873 – Hanged at Beechworth for the murder of John Watt ("The Wooragee Murder")
- James Smith – 12 May 1873 – Hanged at Beechworth for the murder of John Watt ("The Wooragee Murder")
- Pierre Borbun (Barburn, Borhuu) – 20 May 1873 – Hanged at Castlemaine for the murder of Sarah Smith, the publican's wife at the White Swan Hotel, Sunrise Gully, Kangaroo Flat
- Oscar (or Hasker) Wallace – 11 August 1873 – Hanged at Ballarat for the rape of Mary Cook at Mount Beckworth, near Clunes
- Ah Kat (Ah Cat) – 9 August 1875 – Hanged at Castlemaine for the murder of Friedrich Renzelmann at Bet Bet, near Dunolly
- An Gaa – 30 August 1875 – Hanged at Melbourne Gaol for the murder of Pooey Waugh, committed at Vaughan
- Henry Howard – 4 October 1875 – Hanged at Melbourne Gaol for the murder of Elizabeth Wright, licensee of the Frankston Hotel
- John Weachurch (alias Taylor) – 6 December 1875 – Hanged at Melbourne Gaol for attempted murder of Warder Patrick Moran
- John Duffus – 22 May 1876 – Hanged at Castlemaine, having been handed in by his wife for the rape of his eleven-year-old daughter Mary Ann near Goornong
- James ("Donegal Jim") Ashe – 21 August 1876 – Hanged at Ballarat for the rape of Elizabeth Reece at Burrumbeet
- Basileo Bondietto – 11 December 1876 – Hanged at Melbourne Gaol for the murder of Carlo Comisto near Tallarook
- William Hastings – 14 March 1877 – Hanged at Melbourne Gaol for the murder of his wife Annie near Mount Eliza
- Thomas Hogan – 9 June 1879 – Hanged at Beechworth for fratricide at Bundalong, near Yarrawonga

== 1880s ==
- Ned Kelly – 11 November 1880 – Bushranger. Hanged at Melbourne Gaol for the murder of Constable Thomas Lonigan
- Robert Rohan – 6 June 1881 – Hanged at Beechworth for the murder of John Shea at Yalca
- Robert Francis Burns – 25 September 1883 – Confessed to eight murders. Hanged at Ararat for the murder of Michael Quinliven at Wickliffe
- Henry Morgan – 6 June 1884 – Hanged at Ararat for the rape and murder of ten-year-old Margaret Nolan at Panmure
- James Hawthorn – 21 August 1884 – Hanged at Melbourne Gaol for fratricide at Brighton
- William O'Brien – 24 October 1884 – Hanged at Melbourne Gaol for the murder of farmer Peter McAinsh at Lancefield
- William Barnes – 15 May 1885 – Hanged at Melbourne Gaol for the murder of Joe Slack at South Melbourne
- Charles Bushby (alias Baker) – 3 September 1885 – Hanged at Ballarat for attempted murder of Det Sgt Richard Hyland near Gong Gong
- Edward ("The Fiddler") Hunter – 27 November 1885 – Hanged at Bendigo Prison for the murder of Jim Power at the Golden Fleece Hotel, Charlton
- Freeland Morell – 7 January 1886 – Hanged at Melbourne Gaol for murder of fellow sailor John Anderson on the docks at Port Melbourne
- George Syme – 9 November 1888 – Hanged at Melbourne Gaol for the murder of his mother-in-law Margaret Clifford at Lilydale
- William Harrison – 18 March 1889 – Hanged at Bendigo for the murder of 'Corky Jack' Duggan at Elmore
- Filipe Castillo – 16 September 1889 – Hanged at Melbourne Gaol for the murder of Annie Thornton at North Carlton
- Robert Landells – 16 October 1889 – Hanged at Melbourne Gaol for the murder of Peter Sherlock at Chamber's Paddock, about 6 km from Ringwood

== 1890s ==
- John Thomas Phelan – 16 March 1891 – Hanged at Melbourne Gaol for the murder of his de facto wife Ada Hatton at St.James' Place (now Ellis St) South Yarra
- John Wilson – 23 March 1891 – Hanged at Melbourne Gaol for the murder of his fiancée Estella Marks at Darling Gardens, Clifton Hill
- Cornelius Bourke – 20 April 1891 – Hanged at Ballarat for the murder of an elderly prisoner named Peter Stewart in the gaol at Hamilton
- Fatta Chand – 27 April 1891 – Hanged at Melbourne Gaol for the murder of Juggo Mull at Healesville
- Frank Spearin (also called John Wilson) – 11 May 1891 – Hanged at Ballarat for the rape of six-year-old Adeline Shepherd at Eastern Oval, Ballarat
- James Johnston – 18 May 1891 – Hanged at Ballarat Gaol for murdering his wife Mary and their four children in Drummond Street North, Ballarat
- William Coulston (Colston) – 21 August 1891 – Hanged at Melbourne Gaol for the murder of Mary & William Davis at Narbethong
- Frederick Bailey Deeming – Murdered at least six people. Hanged at Melbourne Gaol for the murder of Emily Mather at Windsor – 23 May 1892
- John Conder – 28 August 1893 – Hanged at Melbourne Gaol for the murder of Karamjit Singh near Buchan
- Frances Knorr – 15 January 1894 – "The Brunswick Baby Farmer" – Hanged at Melbourne Gaol for the murder of two infants
- Ernest Knox – 19 March 1894 – Hanged at Melbourne Gaol for the murder of Isaac Crawcour while in the act of burglary at Williamstown
- Frederick Jordan – 20 August 1894 – African American immigrant, hanged at Melbourne Gaol for the murder of his girlfriend Minnie Crabtree at Port Melbourne
- Martha Needle – 22 October 1894 – Murdered five people by poison. Hanged at Melbourne Gaol for the murder of Louis Juncken at 137 Bridge Road Richmond
- Elijah Cockroft – 12 November 1894 – Hanged at Ballarat for the murder of Fanny Mutt at Noradjuha, near Natimuk
- Arthur Buck – 1 July 1895 – Hanged at Melbourne Gaol for the murder of Catherine Norton at South Melbourne
- Emma Williams – 4 November 1895 – Hanged at Melbourne Gaol for the murder of her two-year-old son John at Port Melbourne
- Charles Henry Strange – 13 January 1896 – Hanged at Melbourne Gaol for the murder of Fred Dowse at Lakes Entrance
- Charles John Hall – 13 September 1897 – Hanged at Bendigo for the murder of his wife Minnie at Eaglehawk
- Alfred Archer – 21 November 1898 – Hanged at Melbourne Gaol for the murder of William Matthews at Strathmerton

== 1900s to 1920s ==
- William Robert Jones – 26 March 1900 – Hanged at Melbourne Gaol for murdering eight-year-old Rita Jones at Broadford
- Albert Edward McNamara – 14 April 1902 – Hanged at Melbourne Gaol for arson causing death of his four-year-old son Bert at Carlton
- August Tisler (Sippol) – 20 October 1902 – Hanged at Melbourne Gaol for the murder of Edward Sangal at Dandenong
- James Coleman Williams – 8 September 1904 – Hanged at Melbourne Gaol for the murder of his employer's wife Mary Veitch at O'Grady Street Clifton Hill
- Charles Deutschmann – 29 June 1908 – Hanged at Ballarat for the murder of his wife Isabella Deutschmann at Dobie, near Ararat
- Joseph Pfeiffer – 29 April 1912 – Hanged at Melbourne Gaol for shooting his sister-in-law Florence Whitely at 102 Mills Street, Middle Park
- John Jackson – 24 January 1916 – Hanged at Melbourne Gaol for the murder of Constable David McGrath while in the act of robbing the Trades Hall
- Antonio Picone – 18 September 1916 – Hanged at Melbourne Gaol for the murder of Giuseppe Lauricella at Queen Victoria Market
- Albert Edward Budd (39) – 29 January 1918 – Hanged at Melbourne Gaol for the murder of his foster-sister Annie Samson at Port Melbourne
- George Farrow Blunderfield – 15 April 1918 – Hanged at Melbourne Gaol for the murder of mother and daughter Margaret & Rose Taylor at Trawool
- Colin Campbell Ross – 24 April 1922 – Hanged at Melbourne Gaol for the Gun Alley Murder. Posthumously pardoned in 2007, the only instance of a pardon for a judicially executed person in Australia
- Angus Murray (real name Henry Donnelly) – 14 April 1924 – Hanged at Melbourne Gaol for the murder of Thomas Berriman at Glenferrie Station. Murray was a frequent accomplice of David Bennett

== 1930s to 1960s ==
- David Bennett – 26 September 1932 – Hanged at Pentridge Prison for the rape of a four-year-old girl at North Carlton; he had been sentenced to death, commuted to life imprisonment, for a similar offence in Western Australia in 1911. This was the first execution at Pentridge. Bennett was the last person to be executed in Australia for rape or for any crime other than murder.
- Arnold Sodeman – 1 June 1936 – "The Schoolgirl Strangler" – Confessed to the murder of four girls. Hanged at Pentridge.
- Edward Cornelius – 22 June 1936 – Hanged at Pentridge for the murder of the Reverend Laceby Cecil at St. Saviour's Collingwood ("The Vicarage Murder").
- Thomas William ('Nugget') Johnson – 23 January 1939 – Hanged at Pentridge for the murder of Charles Bunney and Robert Gray at the former Windsor Castle Hotel, Dunolly.
- George Green – 17 April 1939 – Hanged at Pentridge for the murder of Phyllis and Annie Wiseman at Glenroy.
- Alfred Bye – 22 December 1941 – Hanged at Pentridge for stabbing to death Thomas Walker off Treasury Place. Bye took over twenty-two minutes to die.
- Eddie Leonski – 9 November 1942 – "The Brownout Strangler" – Hanged at Pentridge for the murders of Ivy McLeod (at Victoria Avenue, Albert Park), Pauline Thompson (at Spring Street, Melbourne) and Gladys Hosking (at Gatehouse Street, Parkville). Leonski was executed under the jurisdiction of the U.S. military.
- Jean Lee – 19 February 1951 – Hanged at Pentridge for the murder of 'Pop' Kent in Dorrit Street, Carlton; Lee was the last woman executed in Australia.
- Norman Andrews – 19 February 1951 – Hanged at Pentridge for the murder of 'Pop' Kent.
- Robert David Clayton – 19 February 1951 – Hanged at Pentridge for the murder of 'Pop' Kent.
- Ronald Ryan – 3 February 1967 – Hanged at Pentridge for the murder of Prison Officer George Hodson during an escape from lawful custody; Ryan was the last person to be executed in Australia.
