= Coburg Cemetery =

Cemetery in Victoria, Australia

Coburg Pine Ridge Cemetery
- Interactive map of Coburg Pine Ridge Cemetery

Details
- Established: 1856
- Location: Preston, Victoria
- Country: Australia
- Coordinates: 37.7415°S 144.9825°E
- Owned by: Greater Metropolitan Cemeteries Trust
- Size: 25 acres (10 ha)
- No. of interments: >52,000
- Website: Official website
- Find a Grave: Coburg Pine Ridge Cemetery

Coburg Pine Ridge Cemetery is located in the northern Melbourne suburb of Preston, Victoria, Australia. The main entrance is on Bell Street, Preston. The Cemetery is managed by Greater Metropolitan Cemeteries Trust (GMCT), and work closely with local community group, Friends of Coburg.

== History ==
Coburg Pine Ridge Cemetery was established in 1856, in part because of the growing village around the Pentridge stockade. There is evidence of burials dating back to the 1850s, although the early records which were maintained by each denomination group are presumed lost. Existing burial records starting from 1875 are held at Fawkner Memorial Park and show around 52,000 interments until 1971.

A strip of the cemetery along the south boundary was resumed for widening of Bell Street in the 1960s, although it is not known if any burials had to be exhumed. The cemetery reached capacity in 1971, and management was transferred to the Fawkner Memorial Park Trust. Since that time, burials at Coburg Pine Ridge Cemetery have been restricted to additional interments in existing graves at a rate, currently, of around one per month. In March 2010, the Fawkner Memorial Park Trust was amalgamated with 7 other Trusts and formed the Greater Metropolitan Cemeteries Trust (GMCT) which now manages the Coburg Pine Ridge Cemetery and 18 other sites.

== Graves ==
Graves within the Coburg Pine Ridge Cemetery have an unusual numbering system where the numbers were allocated by the order of burial sequence in each area rather than position in rows, resulting in visitors finding an apparently random numbering system. A new system was introduced in the 1920s with a 'new', more accessible, location number, allocated to the 'old' number under the original system.

Some prominent individuals buried at Coburg Cemetery are:

- John Andrew Arthur – Labor member of parliament
- Anna Teresa Brennan – the University of Melbourne's first female law graduate and the second woman to be admitted to the Bar in Victoria in 1911
- John and Catherine Curtin – Parents of Prime Minister John Curtin
- John "Snowy" Cutmore – a notorious gangster, armed robber and stand-over man, most famously known for his death in a gunfight with Leslie "Squizzy" Taylor in a Barkly Street house in Carlton in 1927
- Laurence Cohen – Labor politician and trade unionist, popular during life but died mysteriously, found dead in an Adelaide alley on 11 February 1916 after falling 5 1/2 metres from his bedroom window hours after returning from negotiations for a 44-hour working week offer with striking miners at Broken Hill.
- Charles Web Gilbert – self-taught Australian sculptor
- Joseph Francis Hannan – Labor member of parliament
- George Arthur Keartland – typographer and ornithologist notable for his collecting work on the Horn and Calvert scientific exploring expeditions.
- Walter Henry "Dick" Lee – VFL champion full-forward, eight-time leading goal kicker
- Isaac Mattson – Finnish-born shipbuilder; workers' rights campaigner on Victoria's goldfields and close friend of Eureka Stockade leader Peter Lalor, he had followed the gold rush to Ballarat from California in 1854 and is believed to have been on the front line of the stockade fight.
- James Francis (Jock) McHale – Collingwood footballer and one of the then-VFL’s most successful coaches, leading Collingwood to eight premierships between 1912 and 1949, buried with his wife and two of his children.
- William Guthrie Spence – a Scottish immigrant started his working life as a gold miner at the age of 14, and went on to found the Australian Workers' Union in 1894 and became a Labor member of parliament and Lay preacher
- Archibald Stewart – trade unionist
- Sir Alexander George Wales – Politician and Lord Mayor of Melbourne

There are also victims of the S.S. Dandenong steamer disaster of 1876 and the Sunshine rail disaster memorialised or buried in the cemetery.

Many of the above-listed people's graves are included in the Friends of Coburg Cemetery's "Self Guided Heritage Walk". A map is available on site and the marked graves have signs with further information about 30 interesting and remarkable men and women.

== War graves ==
The cemetery contains the war graves of 201 Commonwealth service personnel, 178 of World War I and 23 of World War II.
