= Madam Ghurka =

Russian-born fortune-teller (1872–1953)

Julia Gibson
- Born: Julia Glushkova; February 7, 1872; Odesa
- Died: September 14, 1953 (aged 81); Carlton North
- Other names: Madam Ghurka
- Occupations: Phrenologist, fortune teller
- Spouses: Christian Olsen; Henry Gibson
- Children: maybe 5

Julia Gibson (February 7, 1872 – September 14, 1953), born Julia Glushkova and known as Madam(e) Ghurka, was an Australian fortune-teller who was born in Odesa. Her first husband died in jail after stabbing her and her second said she was a fantasist. She was a key prosecution witness when Colin Ross was wrongly hanged for murder.

== Life ==
Gibson was born in Odesa with the name Julia Glushkova in 1872. Her parents were Mary (born Morrison) and Nikita Glushkov. She said that she had been sentenced to death for throwing a bomb when she was sixteen. After the sentence was reduced to life imprisonment she escaped. Of more certainty is that she was in Wales at St Mary the Virgin Church in Cardiff on 23 May 1890 when she married a seaman. She and her Norwegian husband, Christian Olsen, had two children before they separated. Her illiterate husband died in jail after he was convicted of stabbing her.

In 1903 she was in Warsaw where she married Henry Gibson who may have had Russian heritage. He did use the stage name of Zakaree Ermakov. According to him they toured Europe where she would be his stage assistant during his performances and she would also make money by telling fortunes. One night in Russia he accidentally shot her. According to her, she was employed as a British secret agent and among her exploits was being shot by a cossack and despite the bullet she went on to kill the son of Aleksey Kuropatkin who was a Russian general and one-time minister of war.

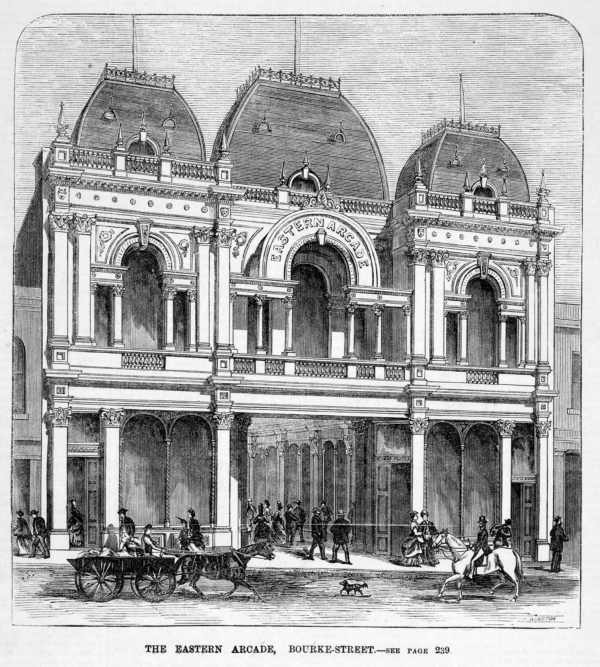
Melbourne's Eastern Arcade

She and Henry were back in Britain where they had met in 1912, four years later they were in South Africa and after they arrived in Australia in 1917, they separated. Gibson set up a business in Melbourne's Bourke Street at the Eastern Arcade as "Madame Ghurka". She was operating as a costumier and as a phrenologist where she, illegally, "told the fortunes" of those who believed she had abilities in that area. She had the custody of her three children, with Gibson, and she also rented a flat to Ivy Matthews.

The Eastern Parade had been constructed in 1872 principally as a hotel but its wine cafe in the 1920s was known for its sex workers and criminally inclined patrons. The saloon was operated by Colin Ross from April 1921 and he sacked Ivy Matthews in November 1921. In the following month 12 year old Alma Tirtschke was raped and murdered, nearby, in what was known as the Gun Alley Murder. Matthews encouraged Gibson to bear witness to hearing Ross's confession to the crime. The Herald newspaper who had increased the police reward to £1,000 reward gave the impression that Ross was guilty and printed his photograph and the contact details of the jury members. During the trial, Matthews, was a crown witness living in Gibson's house in Rathdone Street, Carlton. Ross was wrongly executed, despite his continuing claims of innocence and Gibson took a share of the large reward.

In 1922 Gibson appeared in a case unrelated to the murder and the judge said she was "a bitter, vengeful woman" and "the sort of woman who would say a thing if it was true or untrue".

Ross's lawyer, Thomas Brennan, wrote a book about the case, The Gun Alley Tragedy, and Gibson felt that her reputation was at stake and she published her own account, The Murder of Alma Tirtschke: A Challenge to T.C. Brennan : with a Reply to His Book "The Gun Alley Tragedy" in 1923.

In 1949, The Herald newspaper, printed a description of a house where Gibson and Matthews had once lived. The paper said that the house had been owned by the "notorious fortune teller Madam Ghurka" and that the house had been protected by the police when it contained a crown prosecution witness "Miss Matthews" during the trial of Ross. Gibson said that this report had damaged her reputation and she sued for damages. Despite being a notorious fortune-teller she was awarded £1,000 by the jury as damages for being called a notorious fortune-teller.

Gibson died in Carlton North in 1953. Ross was pardoned in 2008.
