= Tom Brennan (politician) =

Australian journalist, lawyer and politician

The Honourable Tom Brennan
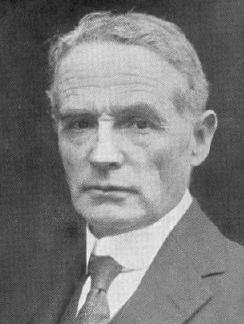

Senator for Victoria
- In office 12 May 1931 – 30 June 1938
- Preceded by: Harold Elliott

Personal details
- Born: 1866/67 Sedgwick, Colony of Victoria
- Died: 3 January 1944 (aged 77–78) Caulfield, Victoria, Australia
- Party: United Australia Party
- Spouse: Florence Margaret Slattery
- Relations: Frank Brennan (brother); Anna Teresa Brennan (sister); Molly Brennan (niece)
- Education: University of Melbourne
- Occupation: Barrister

Thomas Cornelius Brennan KC (1866 – 3 January 1944) was an Australian journalist, lawyer and conservative politician who was elected to the Australian Senate.

== Early life ==
Brennan was born at Sedgwick, near Bendigo, Victoria and was an older brother of Frank Brennan, later Attorney-General in the Scullin Labor government. He was educated locally and apprenticed as a typesetter with the Bendigo Independent. He joined the Melbourne Argus as a printer but subsequently became a journalist and sub-editor. He continued his education part-time, matriculated and earned a law degree at the University of Melbourne in 1900. He married Florence Margaret Slattery in 1902 and was admitted to the bar in 1907.

== Legal career ==
In 1921 he represented Colin Campbell Ross, the accused in the notorious Gun Alley Murder where a twelve year old girl had been raped and murdered. Ross's saloon had recently sacked a barmaid named Ivy Matthews and she encouraged Julia Gibson, a fortune-teller who went by the name of Madam Ghurka, to bear witness to hearing Ross's confession to the crime. The Herald newspaper further gave the impression that Ross was guilty and printed not only his photograph, but also the contact details of the jury.

Brennan was firmly convinced that Ross was innocent and tried in vain to appeal the case up to the Privy Council. Ross was nonetheless convicted and executed the following year. Haunted by guilt over his failure to save his client, Brennan wrote a book detailing his perspectives on the case, The Gun Alley Murder. It was not until 2008 that modern DNA testing finally confirmed Ross's innocence. The case remains one of the most famous instances of miscarriage of justice in Australian legal history.

He was appointed a King's Counsel (KC) in 1928 and was made a Doctor of Laws in 1935 for a thesis published as Interpreting the Constitution. Brennan was prominent in the Catholic community and editor of the Catholic Advocate from 1915 to 1917, when he clashed with Bishop Daniel Mannix, who opposed the introduction of conscription during World War I, like the great majority of the Irish Australian Catholic community.

== Political career ==
Brennan ran unsuccessfully as a Liberal for election to the Victorian Legislative Assembly in 1911, 1913 and 1914. He also ran unsuccessfully as a Nationalist for the seat of Bendigo East in 1921. In 1931, he was appointed to a fill a casual vacancy in the Senate, representing the United Australia Party in 1931 and gained re-election in the 1931 election. He was appointed minister without portfolio assisting the ministers for commerce in the second and third Lyons ministries from October 1934 until he lost his seat at the November 1937 election.

Brennan was survived by his wife and two daughters.
