= Anna Teresa Brennan =

Australian lawyer

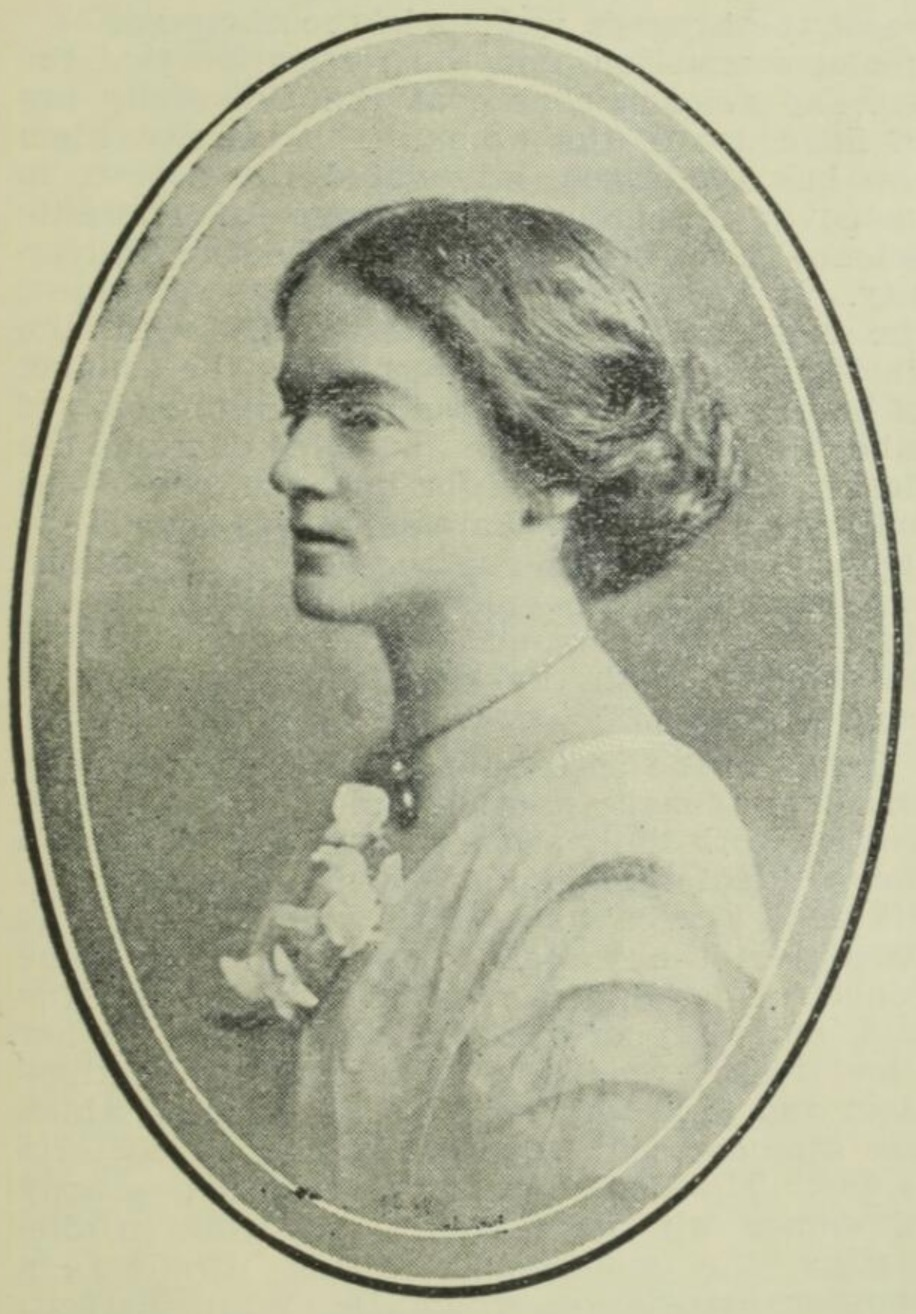
- Brennan in 1914
- Born: 1879
- Died: 1962 (aged 82–83)

Anna Teresa Brennan (2 September 1879 – 11 October 1962) was an Australian lawyer. She was the second woman to be admitted to practice law in Victoria, Australia, and had a distinguished career in Matrimonial law.

== Early life and family ==
Anna Teresa Brennan was born on 2 September 1879 in Emu Creek, Victoria, near Bendigo, to Mary and Michael Brennan, and was their thirteenth child. Michael Brennan (1828–1902) was born in County Donegal, Ireland and migrated to Australia in 1852. Mary Brennan (née Maher) (1838–1920) was born Thurles, County Tipperary, Ireland. She migrated to Australia in 1853. They married in Melbourne on 14 April 1856.

Her siblings included lawyer and politician Thomas (1866–1944), lawyer and politician Francis (1873–1950), and journalist William (1871–1956). Another brother, Richard Brennan, had a daughter, Molly Brennan, who aspired to follow her aunt Anna, into the law.

== Education ==
Brennan's secondary schooling was at St Andrew's College, Bendigo which is now a campus of Bendigo Senior Secondary College.

Brennan commenced studies at the University of Melbourne in 1904, initially studying medicine. She changed to studying law, and graduated in 1909.

== Career ==
Brennan was admitted as a barrister and solicitor of the Supreme Court of Victoria on 1 August 1911.

Brennan is buried at Coburg Cemetery, Preston, Victoria. Her grave is included in a self-guided heritage walk at the cemetery and information about her life is available on a sign posted at her graveside.

== See also ==
- Flos Greig
- Ada Evans
