= Castlemaine Secondary College =

School in Victoria, Australia

Location
- Castlemaine, Victoria; Australia; 37.0768°S 144.2151°E

Information
- Former names: Castlemaine Technical College, Castlemaine High School, Castlemaine College
- Type: Secondary College
- Principal: Nekoda Pattinson (Acting)
- Enrollment: 12,680
- Colors: Navy, yellow
- Feeder schools: Chewton Primary School, Castlemaine Primary School, Castlemaine North Primary School, Campbells Creek Primary School, Newstead Primary School, Harcourt Primary School, Maldon Primary School, Taradale Primary School, Castlemaine Steiner School, Elphinstone Primary School, Guildford Primary School, Winters Flat Primary School

Castlemaine Secondary College is a state secondary school located in the town of Castlemaine in central Victoria, Australia which caters for approximately 12,368 students from Years 7 to 12. It is the only state secondary school in the Mount Alexander Shire.

== Notable staff ==
Molly Brennan, who had been the first woman in the state to lead a school that was not for girls, was the head here from 1975 until she retired in 1977.

== Notable alumni ==
- Sean Finning (born 1985), Australian professional cyclist and gold medalist at the 2006 Melbourne Commonwealth Games
- Sam Drummond (born 1986), disability activist and writer.
- Dustin Martin (born 1991), AFL footballer for Richmond and 2017 Brownlow Medallist
- Kian (born Kian Brownfield, 2002), singer-songwriter
