= Molly Brennan =

Australian headteacher (1914–2012)

- Born: Mary Brennan; 1914; Sedgwick, Victoria, Australia
- Died: 2012 (aged 97–98); Bendigo, Victoria, Australia
- Education: University of Melbourne
- Known for: Headteacher

Mary Brennan (1914 – 15 September 2012), commonly known as Molly Brennan, was an Australian headteacher. She was the first woman to lead a large secondary school in the Australian state of Victoria which was not a girls' school.

== Life ==
Brennan was born in 1914 in Sedgwick, Victoria, a locality now within the City of Greater Bendigo. Her Catholic parents were Mary Anne (nee Conway) and Richard Brennan. Her paternal aunt was the lawyer Anna Brennan and her uncles were the politicians Thomas Brennan and Frank Brennan.

She completed her education at the University of Melbourne where she had studied the family's subject of the law. This was at the time of the depression and finding that there was a shortage of teachers she abandoned her ambition to be an articled clerk. She spent the next thirty years working in different schools, applying for new positions after two or three years in order to gain promotion. Secondary schools were short of female teachers and they were willing to offer better positions to ambitious single women.

Brennan was promoted to her first headteacher position at Preston Girls' High School in Melbourne. The school had opened in 1928.

Brighton High School was the first co-educational school of more than a thousand pupils in the State of Victoria to be led by a woman. The state had removed the gender barrier and this had led to several girls schools being led by men. However, no woman was leading any large school that was not a girls' school. The headship at Brighton High School became vacant and Brennan applied. She became the head here in 1970 after she appealed against an initial decision to appoint a less qualified man. The library at the school is named for her.

In 1974, she tried to repeat her success by applying to be the head of Melbourne High School for boys. She again appealed when a less qualified man was appointed, but this time with no success although she had made a political point.

She was the head of what is now called Castlemaine Secondary College for two years until she retired in 1977.

Brennan died in Bendigo on 15 September 2012.
