= Ernest Knox =

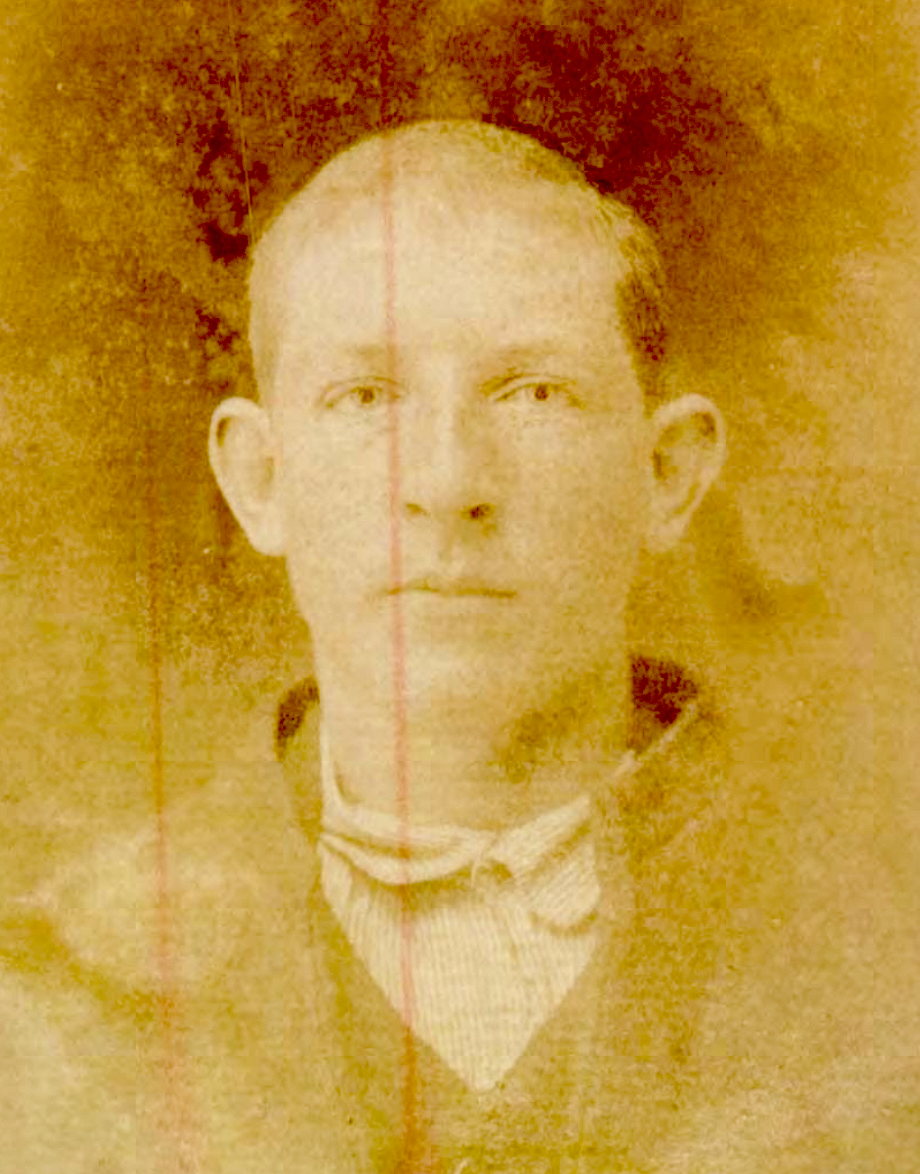
- Born: 27 January 1873; Collingwood, Victoria
- Died: 19 March 1894 (aged 21); Old Melbourne Gaol, Victoria, Australia
- Occupation: Painter
- Status: Executed by hanging
- Conviction: Murder
- Penalty: Death

Ernest Knox (27 January 1873 – 19 March 1894) was an Australian man executed for the murder of Isaac Crawcour, whom he shot during a bungled burglary in Williamstown. He is known for possibly being the source of a skull previously thought to be that of bushranger Ned Kelly.

== Early life and arrest ==
Knox was born in 1873 in Collingwood, to Emma (née Hogan) and John Knox. According to his mother's testimony at trial, Knox received a serious head injury in a road accident as a teenager, and for the remainder of his life showed signs of mental instability.

Shortly before 3am on 12 January 1894, Knox and an accomplice named John Charles Jent (also variously spelled Ghent and Gent) broke into the shop of pawnbroker Michael Crawcour in Nelson Place, Williamstown. The noise woke Mr Crawcour, who hastened downstairs and was shot at twice by the burglars, losing his right earlobe to a bullet. Jent leapt back out the window and escaped via the yard, but Knox remained in the building, unable to unlock the front door and escape onto the street.

Crawcour's son, 20-year old medical student Isaac, also hurried into the passageway leading to the shop, and attempted to wrestle Knox to the ground and disarm him. In the process, Knox shot the young Crawcour in the torso, but Crawcour was able to pin Knox down despite his injuries and give his revolver to his father.

Isaac Crawcour, bleeding from his wound, exited to the building to call out for help in the street. Three men, including two police officers, heard his cries and found him lying on the street exhausted from blood loss and in a serious condition. On entering the shop, they found Knox under guard of the older Crawcour. Once in police custody, he gave police the false name of "Walter Jameson", until admitting under questioning that he was actually Ernest Knox. Jent was also soon arrested in Carlton, at the home of Knox's mother, where he had been boarding.

Young Isaac Crawcour died from his wounds the following day, after giving testimony to police as to the events of the burglary.

== Trial and execution ==
Knox and Jent appeared before court on 19 January 1894, with media describing the young men as hardened criminals. During the hearing, the two defendants were observed to act in an "unseemly manner", chatting and joking with each other "like a pair of country visitors at a theatrical entertainment." Knox was committed to stand trial for wilful murder and Jent of being an accessory before the fact.

Both men were found guilty at trial on 15 February, then sentenced the following day - Knox to death by hanging, Jent to 3 years' prison.

Knox was hanged at the Old Melbourne Gaol on 19 March 1894, and buried in a communal grave inside the prison walls.

== Exhumation from Old Melbourne Gaol ==
In 1929, the Old Melbourne Gaol was slated for demolition, and the mass grave of executed inmates was exhumed for reburial at Pentridge Prison. A number of bones were taken by onlookers and workers as souvenirs - including a skull found under a grave marker on the gaol wall with the initials "E.K." Apparently assuming that "E.K." was Edward (Ned) Kelly, this skull (minus a tooth which had been stolen by one of the workers) was sent to the Australian Institute of Anatomy in Canberra in the 1930s, then later put on display at the Old Melbourne Gaol's museum section, until it was stolen in 1978.

Western Australian man Tom Baxter returned the skull to authorities in 2009, but subsequent DNA testing confirmed it was not that of Ned Kelly, and that "E.K." was more likely to have been Ernest Knox. The missing tooth resurfaced after a call-out to the public led to a man named Christopher Ott bringing a photo of his grandfather holding a skull at the 1929 exhumation, and saying that the tooth had been kept in the family as a souvenir.

Researcher Dr. Richard Bassed also researched the skull after its 2009 reappearance, but concluded that it may have been that of Frederick Deeming, rather than Ernest Knox.

After Kelly's actual remains were finally located on the site of Pentridge Prison, part of the occipital bone of Kelly's skull was confirmed to be found. Notably, it had been sawn through for examination of his brain after death, whereas the skull previously on display had been more or less intact. The piece of skull was interred with Kelly's remains at Greta in 2013.
