= Gun Alley Murder =

1921 crime in Australia

- Victim Alma Tirtschke
- Location: Melbourne, Australia
- Date: 30 December 1921; 104 years ago
- Attack type: Child murder by strangulation, child rape
- Victims: Nell Alma Tirtschke, aged 12
- Accused: George Murphy (posthumously accused)
- Verdict: Guilty (1922); Verdict overturned (2008)
- Convictions: Murder
- Sentence: Death
- Convicted: Colin Campbell Eadie Ross (posthumously pardoned)

The Gun Alley Murder was the rape and murder of 12-year-old Alma Tirtschke in Melbourne, Australia, in 1921. She was a schoolgirl who attended Hawthorn West High School and had last been seen alive close to a drinking establishment, the Australian Wine Saloon; under these circumstances, her murder caused a sensation.

More recently, the case has become well known as a miscarriage of justice. 29-year old Colin Campbell Ross was convicted and executed for Tirtschke's murder, but professed his innocence until his death. When the case was re-examined decades later, DNA evidence confirmed Ross's innocence, and in 2008 he was granted a posthumous pardon. Since Ross's arrest, Tirtschke's family believed that Ross was innocent and that the wrong man had been convicted for Tirtschke's murder.

== Victim ==
Nell Alma Tirtschke, known as Alma, was born on 14 March 1909 at a remote mining settlement in Western Australia, the first child of Charles Tirtschke and Nell Alger. In 1911, Charles Tirtschke accepted a position with a mining company in Rhodesia (now Zimbabwe) and the family moved there, where Nell gave birth to a second daughter, Viola, in 1912. The family was returning to Australia in December 1914 when Nell died of complications relating to a third pregnancy and was buried at sea. After arriving in Melbourne, Charles was unable to care for the children and returned to Western Australia to work in the goldfields. Alma and Viola were cared for by their grandparents, Henry and Elizabeth Tirschke, who were assisted by their five adult daughters.

By 1921, Henry Tirschke had died and the grandmother assumed all parental duties. She was remembered by Viola as a strict disciplinarian who kept a close watch on both daughters. Alma was studious and well-behaved, and excelled in her studies at the Hawthorn West Central School. However, her grandmother greatly restricted her from social activities with other students and she became very shy. An uncle, John Murdoch, said of Alma: "Though of a bright disposition, she was somewhat reserved, and did not make friends readily like some girls. She lacked the vivacious manner that encourages chance acquaintance". Her sister Viola described her as being "soft in speech and soft in manner".

== Murder ==
Tirtschke's task that day had been to go from her grandmother's house in Jolimont to the butcher's Bennet and Woolcock Pty. Ltd. on Swanston Street, collect a parcel of meat, drop it at an aunt's Collins Street home and return to Jolimont.

It was uncharacteristic for Tirtschke to take so long on her errands. A witness said he saw a man following Tirtschke. Reliable witnesses who had nothing to lose or gain by telling police what they knew said Tirtschke was dawdling, apprehensive and obviously afraid.

Just a few metres away from the Australian Wine Saloon in the Eastern Arcade, between Bourke and Little Collins Streets, where Alfred Place runs off Little Collins Street (next to present-day 120 Collins St), Tirtschke was last seen about 3 pm on 30 December 1921. Her naked body was found early the next morning in a lane running east off Gun Alley, not far from Alfred Place. It appeared she had been strangled with a cord.

== Investigation ==
Following the discovery of the body, the owner of the Australian Wine Saloon, Colin Campbell Ross, was charged with her rape and murder. The case against him was based on the evidence of two witnesses, plus some strands of red hair, apparently from Tirtschke's head, which provided a vital connection between Ross and the murder. Ross protested his innocence but was hanged at the age of 29 on 24 April 1922 at Melbourne Gaol.

One of Ross's lawyers, Thomas Brennan, was convinced of his client's innocence and tried in vain to have the case appealed all the way to the Privy Council. Brennan would later go on to become an Australian senator.

The two witnesses, Ivy Matthews and the fortune teller Julia Gibson, were later considered by many to be unreliable, both having had a motive to lie. The saloon had recently sacked Matthews from her position as a barmaid, and Gibson was boarding with Matthews at the time. They both received the £1000 reward for information.

The only credible piece of evidence was the red hair that connected Ross to the case. Ross could also account for his movements at the time Tirtschke disappeared, and later that night, when her body was dumped in Gun Alley. With nothing to hide, Ross had told detectives who interviewed him that a little girl matching Tirtschke's description had passed his saloon, but that this was his only connection with the victim.

== Pardon ==
More reliable scientific examinations in the 1990s disproved the red hair connection and showed that Ross was innocent. After an enquiry by three judges in 2006, Ross was subsequently granted a pardon on 22 May 2008, the date on which the Victorian governor, as the Queen's representative, signed it. The pardon was announced publicly on 27 May 2008. It is the first – and to date only – pardon for a judicially executed person in Australia.

In the book which led to Ross's pardon, author Kevin Morgan revealed for the first time the evidence missed by the police in their original investigation and identified by name Tirtschke's probable killer: a man mistrusted by Alma and Viola – George Murphy – a returned soldier who had paedophilic tendencies and who was married to their cousin.

== In popular culture ==
The Gun Alley Murder is depicted in 1982's Squizzy Taylor, a film about the eponymous Melbourne gangster. The film portrays Taylor (David Atkins) assisting the authorities with the case by intimidating supposed witnesses into revealing what they know about Ross.

== Notes ==
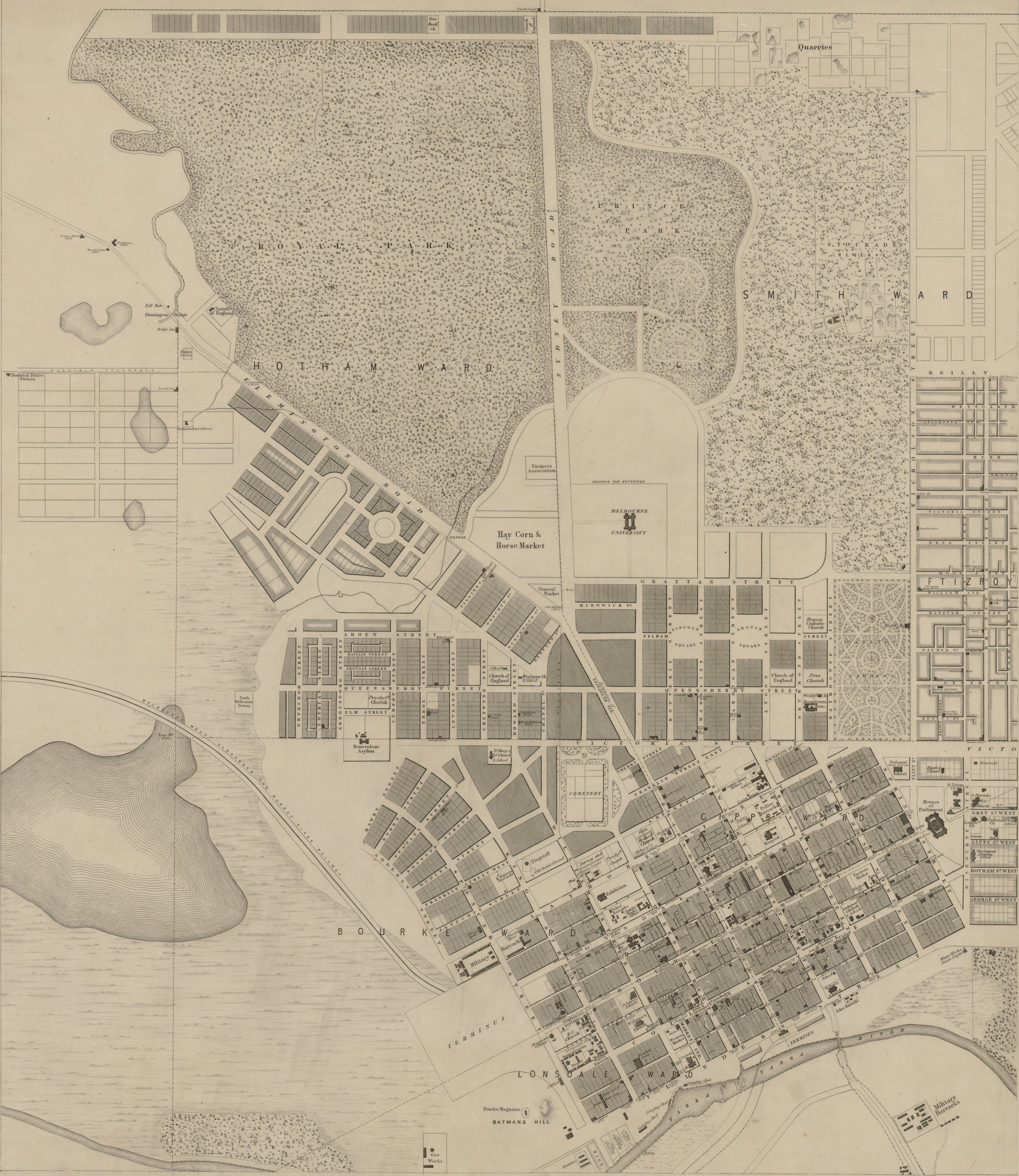
Map of Melbourne in 1855 showing Gun Alley

- Gun Alley no longer exists. Present day 80 Collins St (formerly Nauru House) stands on the site where the laneway once was.

Referring to the map:

- Gun Alley can be seen running south off Little Collins Street, immediately below the Eastern Market (on the corner of Bourke and Stephen streets). There is a short easement at right angles off the end of the alley, which is where Tirtschke's body was found.
- Alfred Place can be seen running between Collins St and Little Collins St next to the Independent Church property (this site now has 120 Collins Street built on it), but the church (St. Michael's) still exists. Tirtschke was last seen on the corner of Alfred Place and Little Collins Street.
- The Eastern Arcade, which housed the Wine Saloon, is the building at the back of the Eastern Market running between Bourke Street and Little Collins Street. The arcade was demolished in 2008.
