= Martha Needle =

Australian murderer

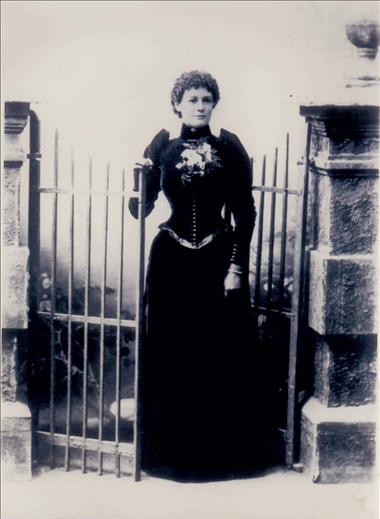
- Needle c. 1880s/1890s
- Born: Martha Charles; 9 April 1863; Near Morgan, South Australia, Australia
- Died: 22 October 1894 (aged 31); Old Melbourne Gaol, Victoria, Australia
- Cause of death: Executed by hanging
- Other name: The Black Widow of Richmond
- Occupation: Housekeeper
- Spouse(s): Henry Needle (m. 1881; murdered. 1889)
- Children: 3 (all murdered)
- Parent(s): Joseph Henry Charles (father); Mary Charles (mother)
- Status: Executed
- Conviction: Murder
- Criminal charges: Murder; Attempted murder
- Penalty: Death

Details
- Victims: 5
- Span of crimes: 1885–1894
- Country: Australia
- State: Victoria

Martha Needle (née Charles; 9 April 1863 – 22 October 1894) was an Australian serial killer who was hanged for poisoning her husband, three children, and prospective brother-in-law. She was convicted for the murder of Louis Juncken, brother of her fiancé Otto Juncken, on 15 May 1894. Although Needle collected substantial sums of insurance money, her exact motive for murdering her family has not been determined. Several times she stated her innocence, but she was eventually hanged. She has been nicknamed The Black Widow of Richmond.

== Early life ==
Needle was born Martha Charles on 9 April 1863 in Morgan, South Australia; her father died when she was quite young. In 1870, her mother Mary Charles married Daniel Foran and had two more children. They were poor and lived in a small two-room house in North Adelaide. Needle claimed that she was often beaten with a stick or rope by her mother and at 12 she was indecently assaulted by her stepfather. (Note: Foran was charged with the offence of indecent assault on Martha Charles and the jury took 30 minutes to return a verdict of guilty. Foran was sentenced to the maximum of 2 years imprisonment on 3 April 1876 by Justice Stow.) She left home at 13 and started working as a housekeeper (Note: reports of Needle's age when she left home vary, however, she was indecently assaulted at age 12 by her stepfather; at that time she was still living at home.) and married Henry Needle in 1882 when she was 18. The marriage was happy and the couple had three daughters - Mabel, Elsie, and May - before the family moved to the Melbourne suburb of Richmond in 1885. After the move, the relationship between Martha and Henry Needle deteriorated; she was an attractive woman and enjoyed the company of men; he was a shy, jealous man who often beat her.

== The killings ==
On 23 February 1885, Mabel Needle died after a short illness. Needle stated that she "seemed to fade" and later collected £100 ($57,600 in 2024) life insurance on Mabel's death. Henry Needle, who was insured for £200, died of a mysterious illness on 4 October 1889, followed by Elsie and May in 1890. Doctors were baffled. Needle spent almost all the insurance money on an elaborate family grave which she visited regularly.

Louis Juncken, a friend from Adelaide, operated a saddlery business with his brother Otto Juncken at 137 Bridge Road, Richmond and, in 1891, Needle sublet the attached house and took in lodgers. Needle began an affair with Otto in 1893 but Louis and his other brother Herman disapproved and attempted to prevent their engagement. The following year Louis became ill and died of suspected typhoid. In June 1894, Herman travelled to Melbourne from Adelaide to handle his late brother's affairs, he ate a meal prepared by Needle and suddenly became ill. He recovered but became ill again the next day after eating breakfast. Two days later, Herman had fully recovered but while eating a lunch prepared by Needle, he was seized by painful violent cramps. Doctor Boyd treated Herman for suspected poisoning and took a sample of Herman's vomit and sent it to the government laboratory for analysis. The analyst reported that the sample contained arsenic.

== Arrest, trial and execution ==
Boyd informed the police of his suspicions and a trap was set, the police asked Herman to ask Needle to make lunch. After being served a cup of tea, Herman literally "blew the whistle", summoning detectives who arrived as Needle was struggling with Herman to upset the teacup, which was found to contain enough arsenic to kill five people.

Needle was charged with attempted murder. The body of Louis Juncken, interred in Lyndoch, South Australia was exhumed and samples sent to Melbourne. The bodies of Henry Needle and the three girls, interred in Kew, were also exhumed. All five bodies were found to contain fatal levels of arsenic and Needle was charged with the murder of Louis Juncken. The trial lasted three days; Needle pleaded not guilty, but was found guilty and sentenced to death.

During her time in gaol, Needle received continued visits from her friends. In her final letter to a friend, Mrs. Owen, she writes "Try not to grieve too much for me." She was executed at 8:00 am on 22 October 1894. When asked for her last words, she replied, "I have nothing to say."

== Afterwards ==
Needle was the third of four women hanged at the Old Melbourne Gaol, where her death mask can be seen. During the Great Depression, the Brighton City Council built bluestone walls to protect local beaches from erosion. The stones were taken from the outer walls of the Old Melbourne Gaol and included the headstones, with initials and date of execution, of all those executed and buried on the grounds. Although most were placed with the engravings facing inwards, Needle's stone was faced outwards, and the initials MN and the date are still clearly visible in the Green Point wall. Over time, sand drifts buried her headstone until its precise location was rediscovered near Wellington Street.

== See also ==
- List of serial killers by country
