= Colin Campbell Ross =

Australian execution victim

- Ross in 1922
- Born: 11 October 1892; Fitzroy North, Victoria, Australia
- Died: 24 April 1922 (aged 29); Old Melbourne Gaol, Victoria, Australia
- Resting place: Bendigo Public Cemetery
- Occupation: Wine bar owner
- Known for: Being wrongfully executed
- Status: Executed by hanging (24 April 1922; 104 years ago); Pardoned (27 May 2008)
- Convictions: Murder (Posthumously pardoned)
- Penalty: Death

Colin Campbell Eadie Ross (11 October 1892 – 24 April 1922) was an Australian wine-bar owner who was wrongfully convicted and executed for the murder of a child, which later became known as the Gun Alley Murder, despite evidence of his innocence. Following his execution, efforts were made to clear his name, but it was not until the 1990s that the key evidence was re-examined using modern scientific techniques, in which the results confirmed Ross's innocence. As a result, an appeal for mercy was made to Victoria's Chief Justice in 2006, and on 27 May 2008 the Governor of Victoria pardoned Ross in what is believed to be an Australian legal first.

== Life ==
Colin Ross was born in Fitzroy North, Melbourne, Victoria, the third of five children born to Thomas and Elizabeth Ross. Thomas Ross died in 1900 leaving his wife to care for the five young children, including one who was newborn. Consequently, none of the children were well educated, each one leaving school as early as possible to find work to help support the family. Colin began working at a local quarry at the age of 11, and over the following years he worked as a labourer and later as a wardsman at the Broadmeadows army hospital. In 1920, Elizabeth Ross became the manager of the Donnybrook Hotel, thirty kilometres north of Melbourne, with Colin as partner and another of her sons, Ronald, as licensee.

During this time, Colin Ross began a relationship with Lily May Brown, who worked in a Melbourne hotel. On 5 March 1920, Ross asked Brown to marry him, and when she refused he produced a revolver. He followed her onto a tram and continued to threaten her until she agreed to meet him later in the day. Instead, Brown contacted police and a plain-clothes detective was present when she kept her appointment with Ross. He was charged with using threatening words and for carrying firearms without permission. On the charge of using threatening words he was sentenced to fourteen days imprisonment, which was suspended on his entering into a twelve-month good behaviour bond, and was fined for carrying the firearm.

In April 1921 the Ross family returned to Melbourne, where Colin, with his brothers Stanley and Ronald, bought a wine shop at the Eastern Arcade in the business centre of Melbourne. After the purchase of the shop, renamed "The Australian Wine Saloon", the Ross brothers continued the employment of its barmaid, Ivy Matthews. She later commented that the saloon had previously attracted a quiet and respectable clientele, but that the Ross brothers were willing to serve anyone, which resulted in the saloon being frequented by alcoholics and criminals. Other tenants in the building resented the intrusion of the wine bar's customers, who reportedly drank to excess, vomited and urinated in the arcade, and made lewd comments to passing women.

On 13 October 1921, one of the saloon's customers was robbed in the outdoor lavatory of the premises, and was shot during a struggle with his assailant. His wound was not serious, but he was unable to give an account of events to police due to the large amount of alcohol he had consumed. An investigation revealed that his assailant was a young English traveller, Frank Walsh, who had spent most of his money and who had been approached by Colin Ross to rob the customer on the understanding that the proceeds would be shared between them. Ross and Walsh were arrested and charged with armed robbery. Ross's comments to police incriminated Matthews, who had until that point refused to discuss the matter. Following a visit by Ross's mother, Matthews began to his behalf, and at the same time began referring to herself as the saloon's manager and drawing money from the saloon's account. Ross made no further attempt to draw Matthews to the attention of police. He was acquitted of the armed robbery charge, but Walsh was sentenced to six months hard labour. Following Ross's acquittal, his brother Stanley confronted Matthews and dismissed her from her position.

== Murder ==
On the afternoon of 30 December 1921, 12-year old Alma Tirtschke's grandmother sent her on an errand. She was to collect a package of meat from a butcher's shop in Swanston Street, Melbourne, and take it a short distance to Collins Street to deliver it to her aunt. The errand should have taken no more than fifteen minutes and when Alma, who was known to be reliable and obedient, failed to return home, her grandmother became alarmed. She was reported as missing, and the police, along with the Tirtschke family, searched for Alma through the night. Early the next morning, Alma's naked body was found in Gun Alley, a laneway off Little Collins Street, near the address Alma had been sent to. She had been raped and strangled.

The case became a major sensation, with the Melbourne press convincing its readers that a maniac was on the loose and likely to strike again. A reward of A£1,250 (A$91,500 in 2013 currency) was offered for the capture of the killer, one of the highest rewards offered in Australia at that time. As time passed with no real progress, the police were criticised and were subjected to public pressure to make an arrest.

Investigations revealed that Alma had last been seen alive between 2:30pm and 3:00pm on the afternoon of her disappearance, at the corner of Alfred Place and Little Collins Streets, near the lane in which her body was subsequently discovered, and that she had been murdered at around 6:00pm. Among the numerous men interviewed was Colin Ross, the saloon manager, who described seeing a girl matching Alma's description outside his saloon. Ross's description of events closely matched that of several witnesses who had also seen her. Several witnesses recounted how Alma looked worried with one stating that a man (not Ross) was following her.

Ross was obviously well known to the local police, having recently been acquitted on the charge relating to his alleged involvement in the shooting and robbing of one of his customers. Despite his willingness to co-operate, police began to interview him in greater detail. He was able to nominate several witnesses who had seen him tending his saloon on the afternoon of Alma's murder and who would confirm that he had not left the premises, but the police remained convinced that he had killed the child, and on 12 January 1922 they arrested him for murder.

== Trial ==
The public fascination with the case intensified as newspapers published news of Ross' arrest, but he told his lawyers, family and friends that he had nothing to fear. As an innocent man, he said, it was only a matter of time before he would be released.

The trial began on 20 February 1922 and witnesses were produced to attest to Ross's guilt. John Harding, who had a previous conviction for perjury and was being detained in prison at the time, "at the Governor's pleasure", testified that Ross had confided in him in prison and had admitted his guilt. Ivy Matthews; Olive Maddox, a prostitute; and Julia Gibson, who worked as a fortune-teller under the name "Madame Gurkha", also testified in court that Ross had confessed the crime to them. The prosecution case was that 12-year-old Alma had chosen to have a drink in Ross's saloon instead of collecting the package for her aunt and had remained there consensually from 3:00pm until 6:00pm drinking wine, at which time Ross had raped and murdered her.

The prosecution also offered forensic evidence in the form of several strands of hair they had obtained from Alma shortly before her funeral. A detective testified that on the day of Ross's arrest he had noticed several strands of "golden hair" on a blanket in his house, which were later removed and examined by the state government analyst, Charles Price, who was a trained chemist but had little previous experience in the new field of forensic science. Price testified that he compared the hairs under a microscope, and concluded that the hair found in Ross's house was a light auburn colour, while Alma's hair was a dark red. He measured the diameter of the hairs and concluded that they were of a different thickness. At one point in his testimony he commented that the hairs on Ross's blanket had most likely fallen from the head of a regular visitor, such as Ross's girlfriend, but after a long testimony he stated that he believed the hairs were "derived from the scalp of one and same person," Alma Tirtschke. His contradictory evidence was accepted by the judge without comment.

Ross's barrister, Thomas Brennan, protested, requesting that a further examination be carried out by a more qualified person, but the judge refused. The jury found Ross guilty of murder and he was sentenced to death by hanging. His legal representatives were convinced of Ross's innocence but found that public opinion remained strongly against him, and news of his death sentence was met with public celebration. Ross's legal representatives sought to obtain the right to appeal but this was refused by the judge, who stated that Ross's guilt had been proven beyond doubt. Brennan sought leave to appeal to the Privy Council of the United Kingdom, but that application was also refused.

Brennan remained supportive of Ross and certain of his innocence, but had exhausted all avenues in his attempt to save Ross from execution. On the eve of his execution, Ross received a letter from a man who failed to give his name but admitted that he had killed Alma, and, although consumed by guilt, was not willing to come forward as it would cause grief to his family. Brennan later wrote that he believed the letter could have been authentic.

== Execution ==
Before his execution, in his farewell letter to his family, Ross wrote: "The day is coming when my innocence will be proved."

Ross composed himself for his quiet but resolute statement from the scaffold:

I am now face to face with my Maker, and I swear by Almighty God that I am an innocent man. I never saw the child. I never committed the crime, and I don't know who did. I never confessed to anyone. I ask God to forgive those who have sworn my life away, and I pray God to have mercy on my poor darling mother, and my family.

Ross was executed on 24 April 1922 at Melbourne Gaol in a particularly gruesome manner. Authorities had decided to experiment with a four-stranded rope rather than the usual three-stranded European hemp. The four-stranded rope did not run freely through the noose and Ross did not die immediately because his spinal cord was fractured, not severed. Although his windpipe was torn and obstructed by his destroyed larynx, the condemned man continued with rasping breaths and convulsed on the rope. Three times Ross bent his knees and flexed his arms before succumbing, slowly strangled to death by asphyxiation. A prison report later ruled that such a rope must never be used again.

== Attempts to clear name ==
Brennan became consumed with guilt over his failure to save Ross's life, eventually writing a book, The Gun Alley Tragedy, in which he attempted to establish that Ross had been hanged for a crime he did not commit. Although Brennan attracted supporters, it was not enough to persuade the Victorian government to have the case re-examined, and over the following years interest began to wane among all but the most ardent of Ross's supporters. Brennan would later pursue a career in politics and was elected to the Australian senate in 1931.

In 1993, Kevin Morgan, a former schoolteacher, became interested in Ross' case and began to research the events surrounding the murder of Alma Tirtschke and Ross's execution. He read handwritten notes in the Bible Ross had kept with him in prison, and which had been preserved by his family following his death. Morgan was moved by the simple notations in which Ross wrote of false witnesses, knowing that he had written these notes without expecting anyone else to read them.

Morgan examined interview records and court transcripts, and discovered information that had been kept from the court at the time, including the testimony of six reliable witnesses who placed Ross inside his saloon for the entire afternoon of Alma's murder. Furthermore, a cab driver, Joseph Graham, had heard screams coming from a building in Collins Street at 3:00 p.m., during the time that Ross was verified as having been in the saloon. Graham's interview had been disregarded by police and he had not been called to give evidence. Following Ross's arrest, Graham attempted to have his story told through a solicitor, but was not permitted to present his version of events in court. Morgan also noted that the witnesses against Ross were of dubious character and could have been motivated to present false testimony; Harding's sentence was reduced after he stated that Ross had confessed to him in prison while Maddox, Gibson, and disgruntled former employee Matthews had shared the reward money. A closer examination of the long testimony of Price regarding the hair samples seemed to support Ross's innocence.

Two years after he began researching the case, Morgan found a file in the Office of Public Prosecutions containing the original hair samples, which had been thought lost. He began a long administrative struggle for the right to submit the hair samples for DNA testing, finally achieving his aim in 1998. Two independent scientific authorities – the Victorian Institute of Forensic Medicine and the forensics division of the Australian Federal Police – found that the two lots of hair did not come from the same person, thereby disproving with certainty the most damning piece of evidence presented at Ross's trial.

On 4 October 2005, the families of both Colin Ross and Alma Tirtschke, represented by Elizabeth Eadie Everett on behalf of the Ross family and Bettye Georgina Arthur on behalf of the Tirtschke family, submitted a petition of mercy. On 23 October 2006 the Victorian Attorney General Rob Hulls, utilising his powers under section 584(b) of the Crimes Act 1958, forwarded the 31-page petition to the Chief Justice, Marilyn Warren, requesting her to consider the plea for Ross. On 20 December 2007, Supreme Court Justices Teague, Cummins and Coldrey delivered a unanimous verdict that there had been a miscarriage of justice in Ross's case. The subsequent pardon, granted on 27 May 2008, is the first example of a posthumous pardon in Victoria's legal history and is to date the only instance of a pardon for a judicially executed person in Australia.

The family of Alma Tirtschke were relieved that Ross had finally been exonerated. In a Fairfax radio interview discussing the pardon, the murdered girl's second cousin recounted how her grandmother was preoccupied with the murder: "She didn't say who was the right man but she said the wrong man was hung." In a later interview on the Nine Network's A Current Affair program, the family stated they believe the true murderer was a family member. In 1996, Morgan interviewed Viola, Alma's sister, and in his book revealed the probable killer to be a man mistrusted by the two girls, George Murphy, a returned soldier who had paedophilic tendencies who was married to their cousin.

== Aftermath ==
The Ross trial was the first in Australasia to obtain a conviction using a scientific comparison of hairs. The case also led to the practice of anonymity for jurors after Keith Murdoch's newspaper, The Herald, sensationalised the case and prejudiced the trial by publishing Ross's photograph and printing the names and addresses of the jury. The Herald was shamed by other newspapers and its headquarters in Flinders Street was nicknamed "the Colin Ross Memorial" by opposition journalists.

In October 2010, Ross's remains were identified and handed to his family for a proper burial.

== Legacy ==
The Gun Alley Murder is depicted in 1982's Squizzy Taylor, a film about the eponymous Melbourne gangster. The film portrays Taylor (David Atkins) assisting the authorities with the case by intimidating supposed witnesses into revealing what they know about Ross.

== See also ==
- List of miscarriage of justice cases
