= Old Melbourne Gaol =

Museum and former jail in Melbourne, Victoria, Australia

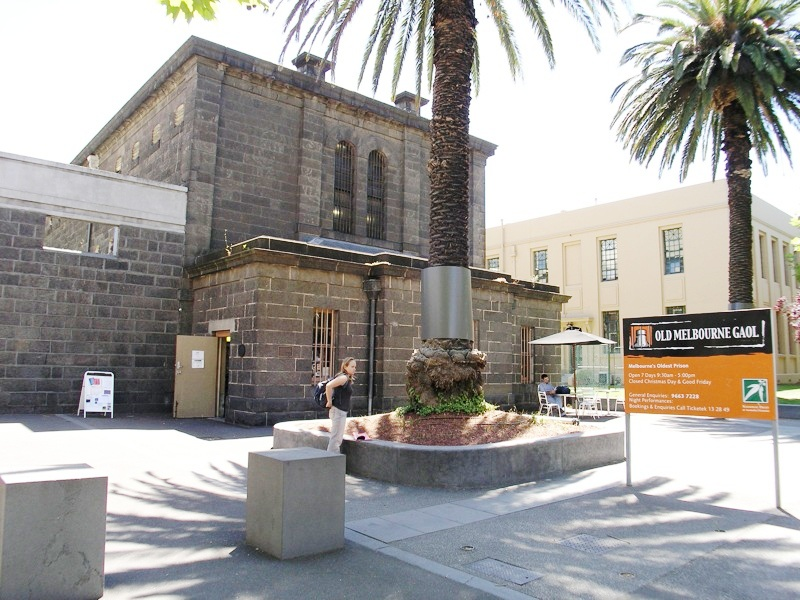
- Interactive map of Old Melbourne Gaol
- Location: Melbourne, Victoria, Australia; 37°48′29″S 144°57′55″E
- Status: Museum
- Opened: 1 January 1845; 181 years ago
- Closed: July 1924; 102 years ago
- Managed by: National Trust of Australia
- Website: www.oldmelbournegaol.com.au

Victorian Heritage Register
- Official name: Old Melbourne Gaol
- Type: State Registered Place
- Designated: 20 August 1982
- Reference no.: H1553
- Heritage Overlay number: HO789

The Old Melbourne Gaol is a former jail and current museum on Russell Street, in Melbourne, Victoria, Australia. It consists of a bluestone building and courtyard, and is located next to the old City Police Watch House and City Courts buildings, and opposite the Russell Street Police Headquarters. It was first constructed starting in 1839, and during its operation as a prison between 1845 and 1924, it held and executed some of Australia's most notorious criminals, including bushranger Ned Kelly and serial killer Frederick Bailey Deeming. In total, 133 people were executed by hanging. Though it was used briefly during World War II, it formally ceased operating as a prison in 1924, with parts of the jail being incorporated into the RMIT University, and the rest becoming a museum.

The three-storey museum displays information and memorabilia of the prisoners and staff, including death masks of the executed criminals. At one time the museum displayed what was believed at the time to be Ned Kelly's skull, before it was stolen in 1978, as well as the pencil used by wrongly convicted Colin Campbell Ross to protest his innocence in writing, before being executed.

== History ==
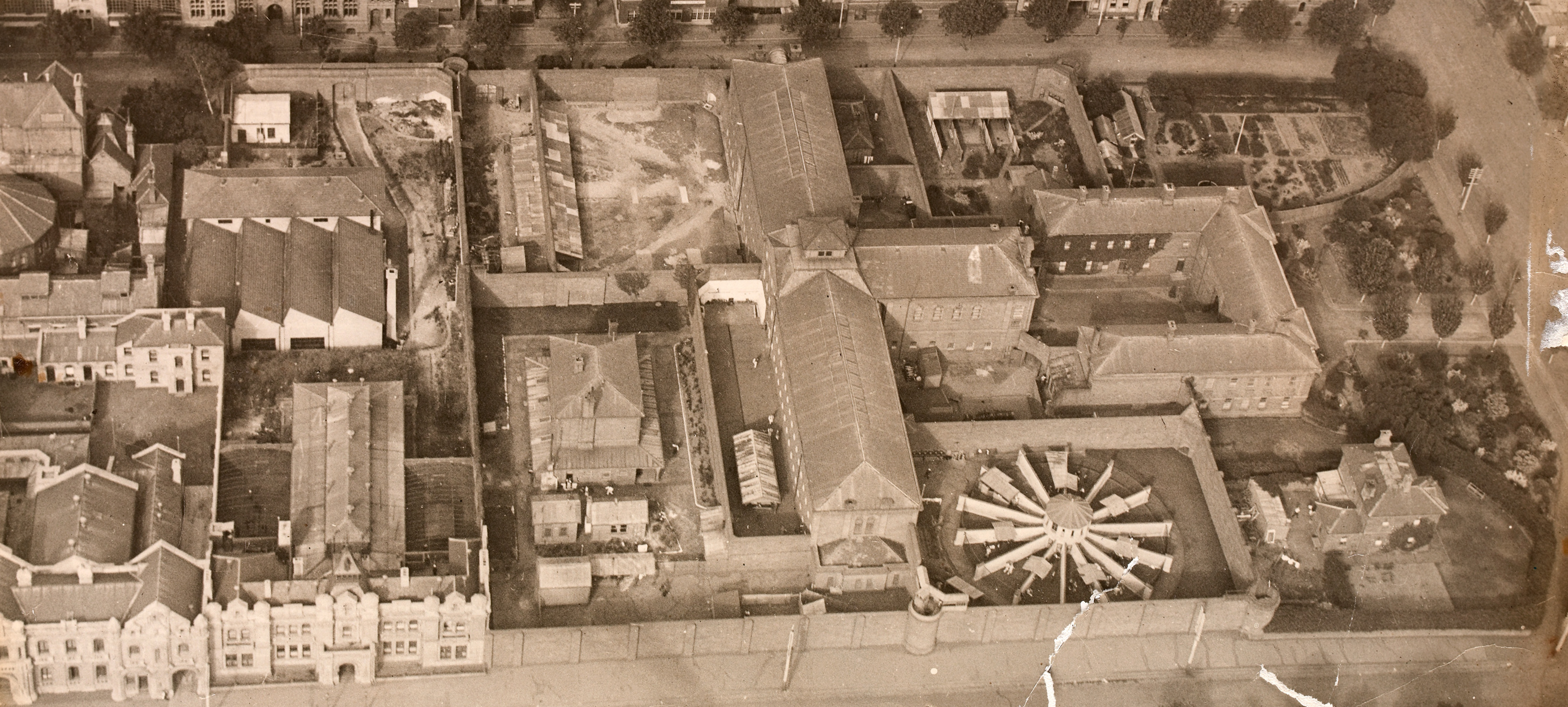
Old Melbourne Gaol in 1922

An allotment of scrubland to the north-east of Melbourne was selected as Port Phillips first permanent gaol. On 1 January 1838, George Wintle was appointed to be gaoler at the prison at £100 a year; with the site becoming colloquially known as Wintle's Hotel. Construction of the gaol started in 1839–1840 on Collins Street West, but it was considered too small at the time. A second gaol was then built between 1841 and 1844 at the corner of Russell and La Trobe Streets, adjoining the then Supreme Court. The first cell block was opened for prisoners in 1845, but the facilities were considered inadequate; escapes occurring frequently. The gaol was already crowded by 1850.

With the discovery of gold in 1851 (when the Port Phillip District became the new Colony of Victoria), and the resulting influx of population, law and order became more difficult to maintain. Subsequently, a new wing, with its own perimeter wall, was constructed between 1852 and 1854; the building using bluestone instead of sandstone. The design was based on that of British prison engineer Joshua Jebb, and especially the designs for the Pentonville Model Prison in London (which suited the current prison reform theories at the time). The new wing was extended in between 1857 and 1859, with the boundary wall also being extended during this time. In 1860, a new north wing was built; which included entrance buildings, a central hall and chapel. Between 1862 and 1864, a cell block was built for female prisoners on the western side – it was basically a replica of the present east block (until this time, female convicts were not kept apart from the male prisoners). In 1864, the perimeter wall, and the gaol overall, was completed; making it a dominant feature of authority on the Melbourne skyline.

At its completion, the prison occupied an entire city block, and included exercise yards, a hospital in one of the yards, a chapel, a bath house and staff accommodation. A house for the chief warders was built on the corner of Franklin and Russell streets, and 17 homes were built for gaolers on Swanston Street in 1860. Artefacts recovered from the area indicate that even the gaolers and their families lived within the gaol walls in the 1850s and 1860s.

=== Operation ===
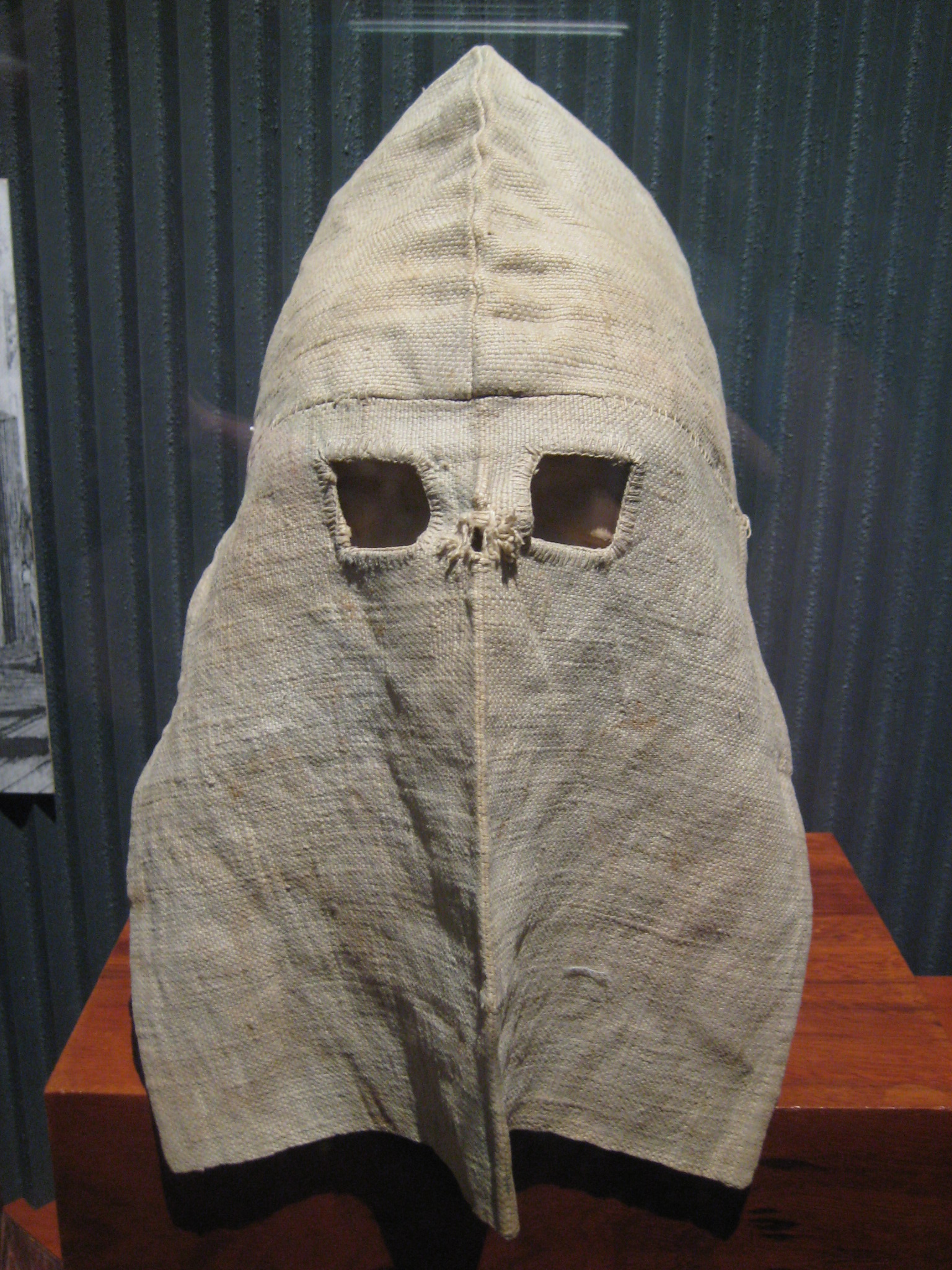
Calico hood

Much of daily life inside the gaol could be gleaned from sources such as diaries written by John Castieau, governor of the gaol between 1869 and 1884. During its operation, the gaol was used to house short-term prisoners, lunatics and some of the colony's most notorious and hardened criminals. It also housed up to twenty children at a time – including those imprisoned for petty theft or vagrancy, or simply those staying with a convicted parent. Babies under twelve months old were allowed to be with their mothers. The youngest prisoner was recorded as three-year-old Michael Crimmins, who spent 6 months in the prison in 1857 for being idle and disorderly. In 1851, the 13 and 14-year-old O'Dowd sisters were imprisoned because they had nowhere else to go.

Prisoners convicted of serious crimes, such as murder, arson, burglary, rape and shooting, would begin their time on the ground floor with a time of solitary confinement. They were also forbidden from communicating with other prisoners, which was strictly enforced by the usage of a silence mask, or calico hood, when outside their cells. They would only be given a single hour of solitary exercise a day, with the remaining 23 hours spent in their cells. Inside the cells, prisoners would be able to lie on a thin mattress over the slate floors. They could only bathe and change clothes once a week, and attend the chapel on Sundays (with a Bible provided to promote good behaviour). Prisoners might only have been allowed to finally socialise with other prisoners towards the end of their sentences.

The routine for prisoners was regulated by a system of bells, and enforced by punishments; prisoners who obeyed the rules would be promoted to the second floor – whereby they would be allowed to work in the yards every day. Male prisoners would perform hard labour – including breaking rocks, and other duties in the stone quarries, while women would sew, clean and cook. Women would also make shirts and waistcoats for male prisoners, as well as act as domestic servants for the governor and his family. Prisoners who had become trusted, those nearing the completion of their sentence, and debtors, were housed on the third floor communal cells. These top level cells were large, and held up to six prisoners at time; and were mostly reserved to prisoners convicted of minor crimes such as drunkenness, vagrancy, prostitution or petty theft.

=== Executions ===
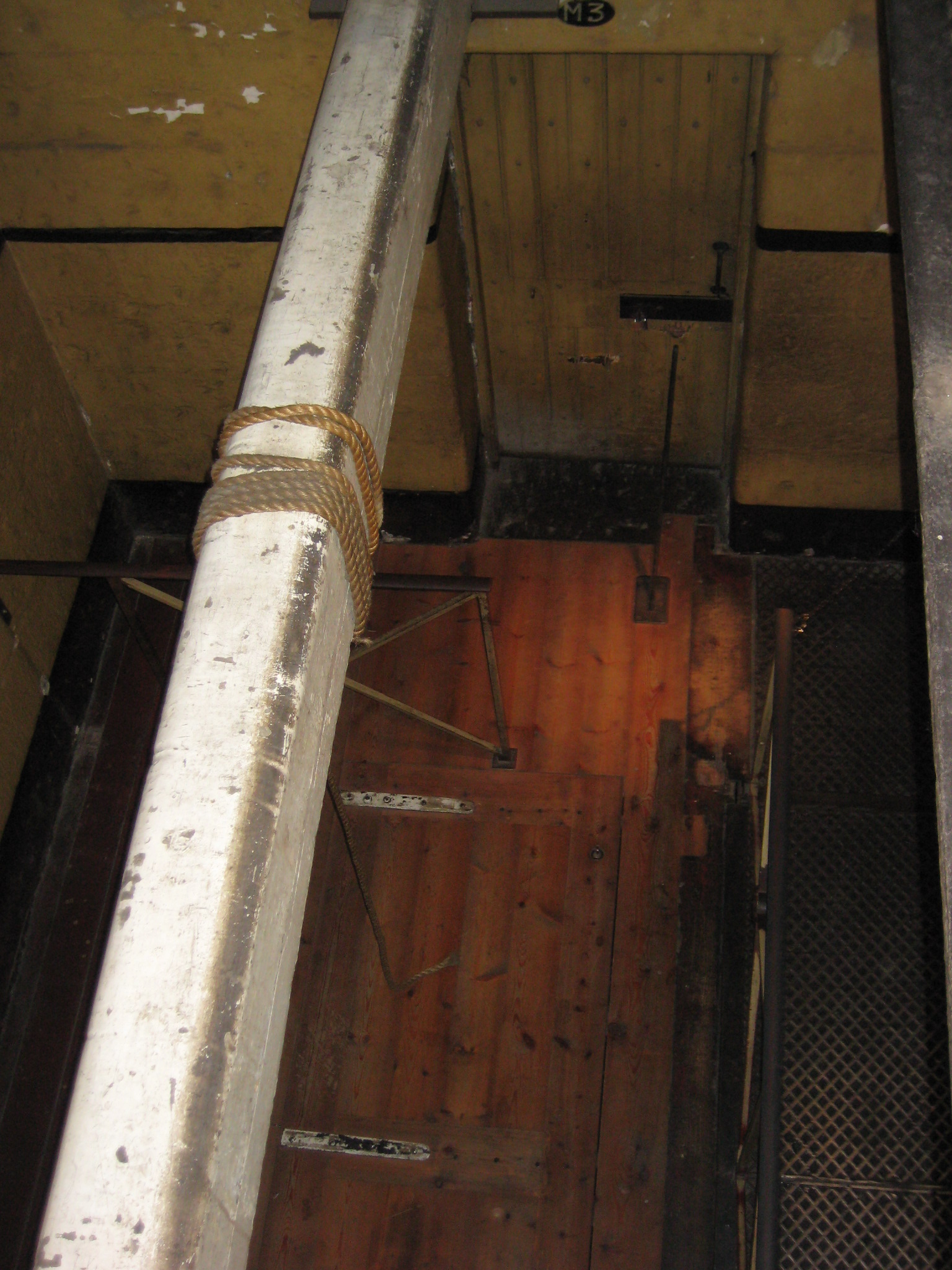
Old Melbourne Gaol gallows

During its operation, the gaol was the setting for 133 hangings. The most infamous was that of bushranger Ned Kelly at the age of 25, on 11 November 1880. After a two-day trial, Kelly was convicted of killing a police officer. As stated by law at the time, executed prisoners were buried in unmarked graves in the gaol burial yard. Before burial, a death mask was produced from the executed prisoners head as part of the phrenological study of hanged felons. Historian and associate professor of Wollongong University, John McQuilton, states that the lack of monitoring for burial processes was odd, given Victorian society's normally brilliant attention to detail.

The gallows occupied several different sites within the gaol. A free-standing scaffold was used for early executions, initially outside the main gate and later in one of the yards; for a triple hanging in 1864 it was erected just inside the main gate complex. Diarist Charles Evans witnessed the aftermath of the 1853 triple hanging of bushrangers William Atkins, George Wilson and George Melville:

All went to Melbourne. Passed by the jail and saw the tightened ropes which supported the lifeless bodies of three wretches who had been executed a half an hour before. The bodies were hidden from view by a wooden erection, a contrivance which takes a little from the horror of the exhibition. To have the last awful grapple with death set up like curiosity for the edification of a gaping multitude is a sickening contrivance unworthy of an advanced country.

After 1864 a fixed gallows was installed below the octagon across the main axis of the prison block, against the wall dividing the male block from the female block. It comprised a single-leaf trap cut into the metal walkway, with iron sockets in either wall above, into which the beam was placed for each hanging (a common design, used in other Victorian gaols at Ararat, Geelong, Beechworth, Ballarat, Bendigo, Castlemaine, Melbourne and Pentridge; and interstate at Adelaide and Long Bay, New South Wales). It was later moved a few metres to a side gallery below the octagon, where it remains today.

The first hanging of a woman in Victoria, Elizabeth Scott, was performed in the prison on 11 November 1863 – along with her co-accused, Julian Cross and David Gedge. The last person to be executed was Angus Murray in 1924, the same year the gaol was closed.

==== Ned Kelly ====
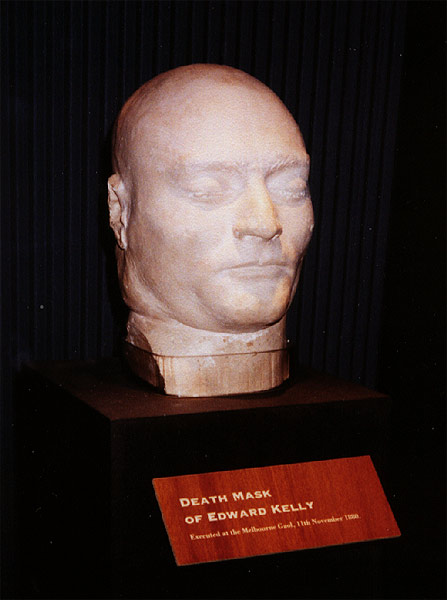
Death mask of Ned Kelly

Edward "Ned" Kelly, born sometime between June 1854 and June 1855, was an Irish-Australian bushranger. He was seen by some as merely a cold-blooded killer, while to others he was a folk hero for his defiance of the colonial authorities. As a youth he clashed with the Victoria Police, and after an incident at his home in 1878, police parties searched for him in the bush. He killed three policemen, and subsequently the colony proclaimed Kelly and his gang wanted outlaws. A final violent confrontation with police took place at Glenrowan on 28 June 1880. Kelly, dressed in a home-made plate metal armour and helmet, was captured and sent to gaol. He was hanged for murder at the Old Melbourne Gaol in November 1880. His notoriety affirmed him as a polarising iconic figure in Australian history, folk lore, literature, art and film.

==== Colin Campbell Ross ====
Colin Campbell Ross, an Australian wine-bar owner, was wrongly convicted of the rape and murder of 12-year-old Alma Tirtschke in December 1921. The case, dubbed the Gun Alley Murder, was heavily influenced by public hysteria at the time, which ultimately served to condemn him. Despite his pleas of innocence (including an attempt whereby a letter was thrown over the gaol walls), he was executed by hanging in the gaol in April 1922 (only 115 days after the body was found). A new four-strand rope was used for the first time at the execution, and proved to be a failure; Ross slowly strangled for between 8 and 20 minutes before his death. A prison report later ruled that such a rope must never be used again. He was posthumously pardoned on 27 May 2008.

==== Frederick Bailey Deeming ====
Frederick Bailey Deeming was born on 30 July 1853. At 16 years of age he ran away to sea, and thereafter, he began a long career of crime, largely thieving and obtaining money under false pretences. He was responsible for the murder of his first wife Marie, and his four children, at Rainhill, England, on or about 26 July 1891, and a second wife, Emily, at Windsor, Melbourne, on 24 December 1891. Less than three months elapsed between the discovery of Emily Mather's body in Windsor, Melbourne, in March 1892, and Deeming's execution at the Old Melbourne Gaol for her murder in May 1892; a remarkably short time by comparison to modern western legal standards. After his execution, it was reported that over 12,000 people cheered on the streets outside, and there was public speculation that Deeming was in fact Jack the Ripper.

==== Maulboyheener and Tunnerminnerwait ====
"Tragically two of these (Aboriginal) men, Tunnerminnerwait (known as Jack) and Maulboyheenner (known as Bob, or sometimes called Timmy or Jimmy), became the first people executed in the Port Phillip District. This took place in 1842, a mere seven years after John Batman's fraudulent treaty with the Kulin people, when the two Tasmanian Aboriginal men were publicly hanged for murder." The Tunnerminnerwait and Maulboyheenner public marker exists at the place of execution. The website contains historical research and information on the artists commissioned for the marker, Artist Brook Andrew, along with Trent Walter.

"Two Tasmanian Aboriginal men, clad in white pyjamas, went to their deaths on a makeshift gallows in Melbourne in 1842. The contemporaneous executions were apparently quite a spectacle: one man, Maulboyheenner, twisting on the rope, strangled slowly in front of a crowd of 5000. They had been convicted of killing two whalers in Western Port. Both the Tasmanians and the whalers – one was called the Yankee – were a long way from home." They were arrested at Powlett River.

==== Executions ====
Name	Year born	Execution date	Crime
Maulboyheenner (aka Bob) (Aboriginal)		20 January 1842 (Age 27)	Murder
Tunnerminnerwait (aka Jack) (Aboriginal)		20 January 1842 (Age 27)	Murder
Charles Ellis		20 June 1842 (Age 18)	Shooting with intent to murder
Martin Fogarty		20 June 1842 (Age 18)	Shooting with intent to murder
Daniel Jepps		20 June 1842 (Age 27)	Shooting with intent to murder
Alkapareet (aka Roger) (Aboriginal)		5 September 1842 (Age 25)	Murder
Jeremiah Connell		27 January 1847 (Age 27)	Murder
Bobby (Aboriginal)		30 April 1847 (Age 25)	Murder
Ptolemy (Aboriginal)		30 April 1847 (Age 25)	Murder
John Healey		29 November 1847 (Age 29)	Murder
Augustus Dancey (or Dauncey)		1 August 1848 (Age 19)	Murder
Patrick Kennedy		1 October 1851 (Age 30)	Murder
James Barlow		22 May 1852 (Age 32)	Murder
John Riches		3 November 1852 (Age 29)	Murder
George Pinkerton		4 April 1853 (Age 19)	Murder
Aaron Durrant		11 July 1853 (Age 38)	Robbery
John Smith		23 August 1853 (Age 25)	Robbery
Henry Turner		23 August 1853 (Age 25)	Robbery
William Atkins		3 October 1853 (Age 29)	Robbery under arms
George Wilson		3 October 1853	Robbery under arms
George Melville		3 October 1853	Robbery under arms
Patrick O'Connor		24 October 1853	Attempted murder
Henry Bradley		24 October 1853	Attempted murder
Michael Finnessy		25 October 1853	Murder
Alexander Ram		25 October 1853	Murder
John Smith		23 November 1853	Rape
Joseph West		27 December 1853	Rape
James Button		28 March 1854	Shooting with intent
David Magee		25 April 1854	Murder
William Thoroughgood		23 May 1854	Rape
John Hughes		25 September 1854	Murder
James McAlister		23 July 1855	Murder
James Condon (alias Arthur Somerville)		24 November 1855	Robbery
John Dixon		24 November 1855	Robbery
Alfred Henry Jackson		24 November 1855	Robbery
William Twiggem	1824	2 March 1857	Murder
Chu-a-Luk	1827	2 March 1857	Murder
James Cornick		16 March 1857	Murder
Frederick Turner		27 April 1857	Robbery
Thomas Williams		28 April 1857	Murder
Henry Smith (alias Brennan)		28 April 1857	Murder
Thomas Maloney		28 April 1857	Murder
Francis Brannigan		29 April 1857	Murder
William Brown		29 April 1857	Murder
Richard Bryant		29 April 1857	Murder
John Chisley		30 April 1857	Murder
James Woodlock		1 June 1857	Murder
Chong Sigh		3 September 1857	Murder
Hing Tzan		3 September 1857	Murder
John Mason		6 November 1857	Murder
Edward Brown		1 March 1958	Murder
William Jones		1 March 1958	Murder
Samuel Gibbs		12 November 1858	Murder
George Thompson		12 November 1858	Murder
Edward Hitchcock		29 November 1858	Murder
Christian Von Sie (or Von See)		29 November 1858	Murder
Thomas Ryan		11 April 1859	Murder
William ("Plaguey Billy") Armstrong		11 April 1859	Shooting with intent
George ("The Butcher") Chamberlain		11 April 1859	Shooting with intent
Richard Rowley		26 July 1859	Violent Assault
William Siddons		7 November 1859	Rape
George Waines		16 July 1860	Murder
Edward Fenlow (alias Reynolds)		20 August 1860	Murder
John McDonald		30 September 1860	Murder
William Smith		22 April 1861	Murder
Henry Cooley		11 July 1861	Murder
Nathaniel Horatio Ruby		5 August 1861	Murder
Martin Rice		30 September 1861	Murder
Thomas Sanders		31 October 1861	Rape
Samuel Pollett		29 December 1862	Rape
Thomas McGee		19 February 1863	Murder
Julian Cross		11 November 1863	Murder
David Gedge	1844	11 November 1863	Murder
Elizabeth Scott	1840	11 November 1863	Murder
James Barrett		1 December 1863	Murder
Christopher Harrison	1809	3 August 1864	Murder
William Carver	1824	3 August 1864	Robbery under arms
Samuel Woods	1823	3 August 1864	Robbery under arms
John Stacey		5 April 1865	Murder
Joseph Brown		5 May 1865	Murder
Peter Dotsalaere		6 July 1865	Murder
Robert Bourke	1841	29 November 1866	Murder
Bernard Cunningham		31 March 1868	Murder
Joseph Whelan		31 March 1868	Murder
Michael Flannigan	1833	31 March 1869	Murder
James Ritson		3 August 1869	Murder
Patrick Smith		4 August 1870	Murder
James Cusack		30 August 1870	Murder
James Seery		14 November 1870	Murder
Patrick Geary		4 December 1871	Murder
Edward Feeney		14 May 1872	Murder
An Gaa		30 August 1875	Murder
Henry Howard		4 October 1875	Murder
John Taylor (aka Weechurch)	1830	6 December 1875	Attempted murder
Basilo Bondietto		11 December 1876	Murder
William Hastings		14 March 1877	Murder
Ned Kelly	1854	11 November 1880	Murder
James Hawthorn		21 August 1884	Murder
William O'Brien		24 October 1884	Murder
William Barnes		15 May 1885	Murder
Freeland Morell	1847	6 January 1886	Murder
George Symes		8 November 1888	Murder
Filipe Castillo	1869	16 September 1889	Murder
Robert Landells	1837	16 October 1889	Murder
John Thomas Phelan	1861	16 March 1891	Murder
John Wilson	1868	23 March 1891	Murder
Frank Spearin (aka John Wilson)		11 May 1891	Rape
William Coulston		24 August 1891	Murder
Frederick Deeming		23 May 1892	Murder
John Conder		28 August 1893	Murder
Frances Lydia Alice Knorr	1867	15 January 1894	Murder
Ernest Knox	1873	19 March 1894	Murder
Frederick Jordan	1864	20 August 1894	Murder
Martha Needle	1864	22 October 1894	Murder
Arthur Buck	1868	1 July 1895	Murder
Emma Williams		4 November 1895	Murder
Charles Strange	1874	13 January 1896	Murder
Alfred Archer	1866	21 November 1898	Murder
William Robert Jones		26 March 1900	Murder
Albert Edward McNamara		14 April 1902	Arson causing death
August Tisler		20 October 1902	Murder
James Coleman Williams	1885	8 September 1904	Murder
Joseph Victor Pfeiffer		29 April 1912	Murder
John Jackson		24 January 1916	Murder
Antonio Picone		18 September 1916	Murder
Albert Budd		29 January 1918	Murder
Arthur Geoffrey Oldring		15 April 1918	Murder
George Farrow Blunderfield		15 April 1918	Murder
Colin Campbell Ross	1892	24 April 1922	Murder – pardoned in 2008
Angus Murray	1882	14 April 1924	Murder

=== Closure and reopening ===
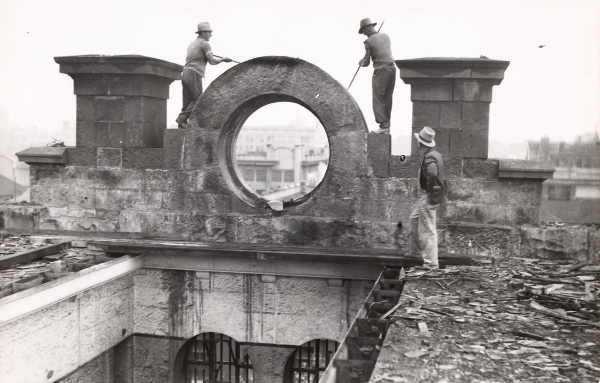
Demolishing the Old Melbourne Gaol in 1937

In 1870, a review of the penal system was conducted, with the recommendation being made to close the gaol and relocate prisoners to more suitable locations. The gaol gradually slowed its operations, and demolished portions of the original site between 1880 and 1924. In 1924, the gaol was finally closed. However, in March 1927, the Old Melbourne Gaol was integrated into part of the new Emily McPherson College and was used for educational purposes. This necessitated changes to the prison; in 1929, despite poor record keeping of prisoner burials, historical evidence suggested the remains of approximately 32 executed prisoners, including Ned Kelly, were exhumed from the Old Melbourne Gaol and buried at mass graves in a quarry at Pentridge. In 1930, the women's cell block, walls and several other buildings were demolished, and a further four coffins were believed to have been moved to Pentridge in 1937.

As the gaol was progressively decommissioned, the building's fabric, including bluestone grave markers of some of the executed prisoners, was incorporated into a sea wall at Brighton in the 1930s; added to the Victorian Heritage Register in 2004. The grave marker for Martha Needle, executed in 1894, was rediscovered after being buried by metres of sand.

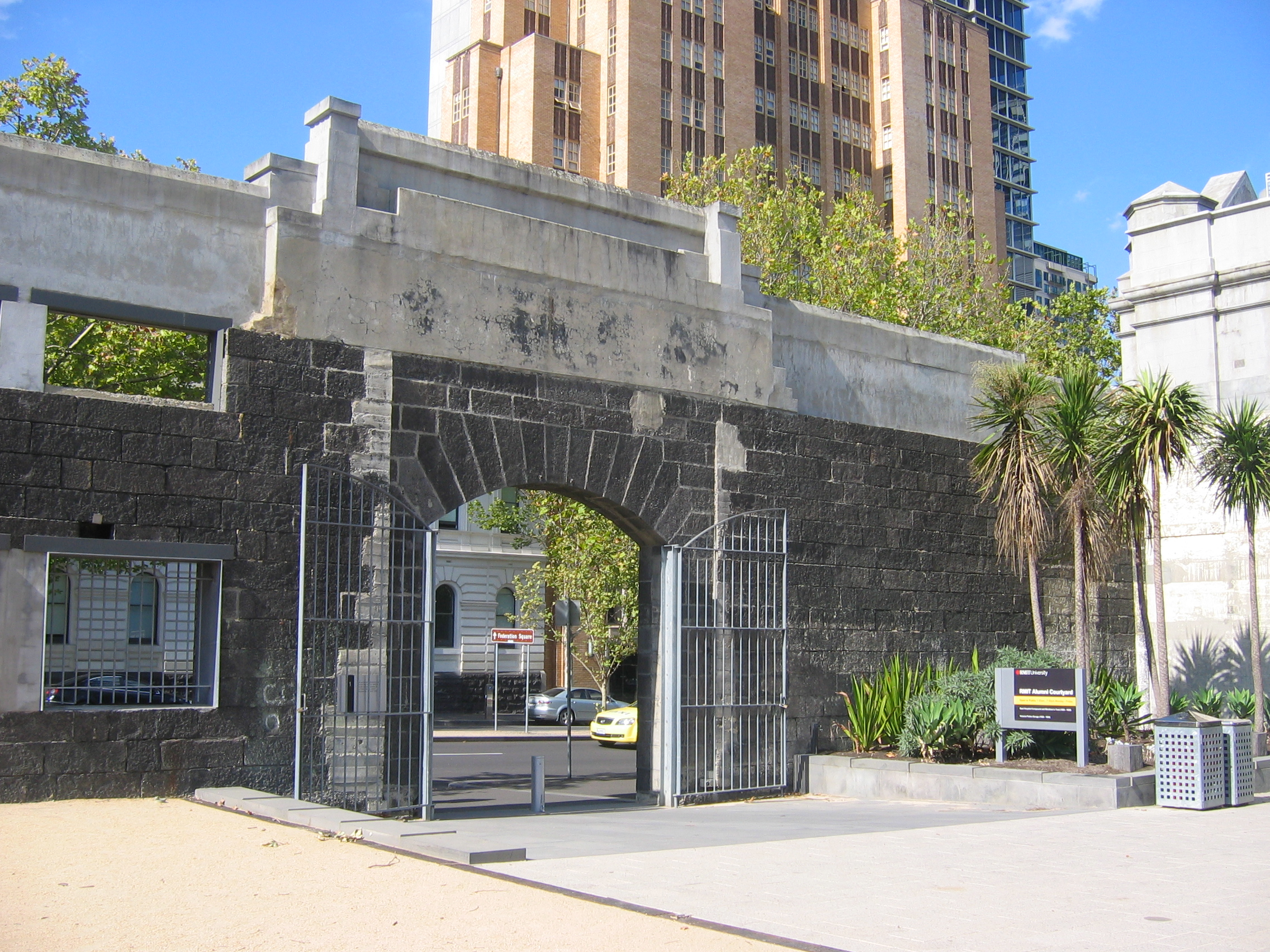
Gates of the gaol, now part of RMIT

During World War II, the gaol was used as a military prison for soldiers found to be absent without leave. A new wall was built in the eastern courtyard during this time, so that cell block inmates were separated from the college girls. After the end of the war, the section used for holding prisoners was then used only as a storage facility for the Victoria Police force, whose headquarters were nearby in Russell Street.

In May 1974, the sections used by the school were remodelled by architects Eggleston, McDonald and Secomb, to act as the schools food and fashion departments. The Emily McPherson College was merged into RMIT University in 1979, bringing the gaol entrance gates, and other facilities alongside it. In 1990, RMIT performed work to restore the enclosed balcony to its former 1927 design. In 1994, RMIT performed further work to landscape the inner courtyard, and in 1995, removed the temporary war-time pavilion classrooms. As of 2010, the sections that RMIT owns are collectively known as the "RMIT Building 11. Architect: Colonial Government Architect", and include the entrance block and chapel; with the bath house and chapel serving as art studios.

== Museum ==
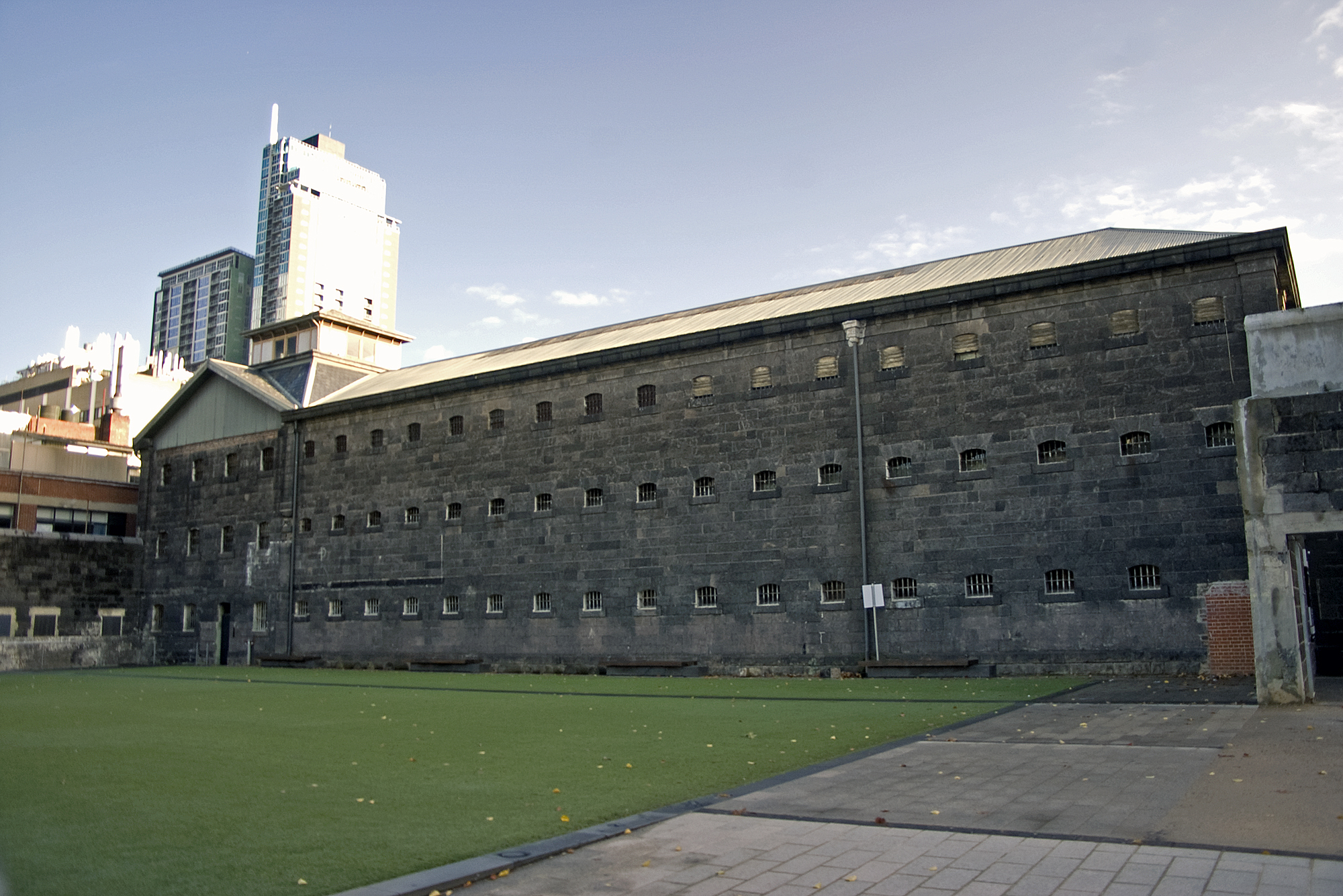
Exterior of the Old Melbourne Gaol.

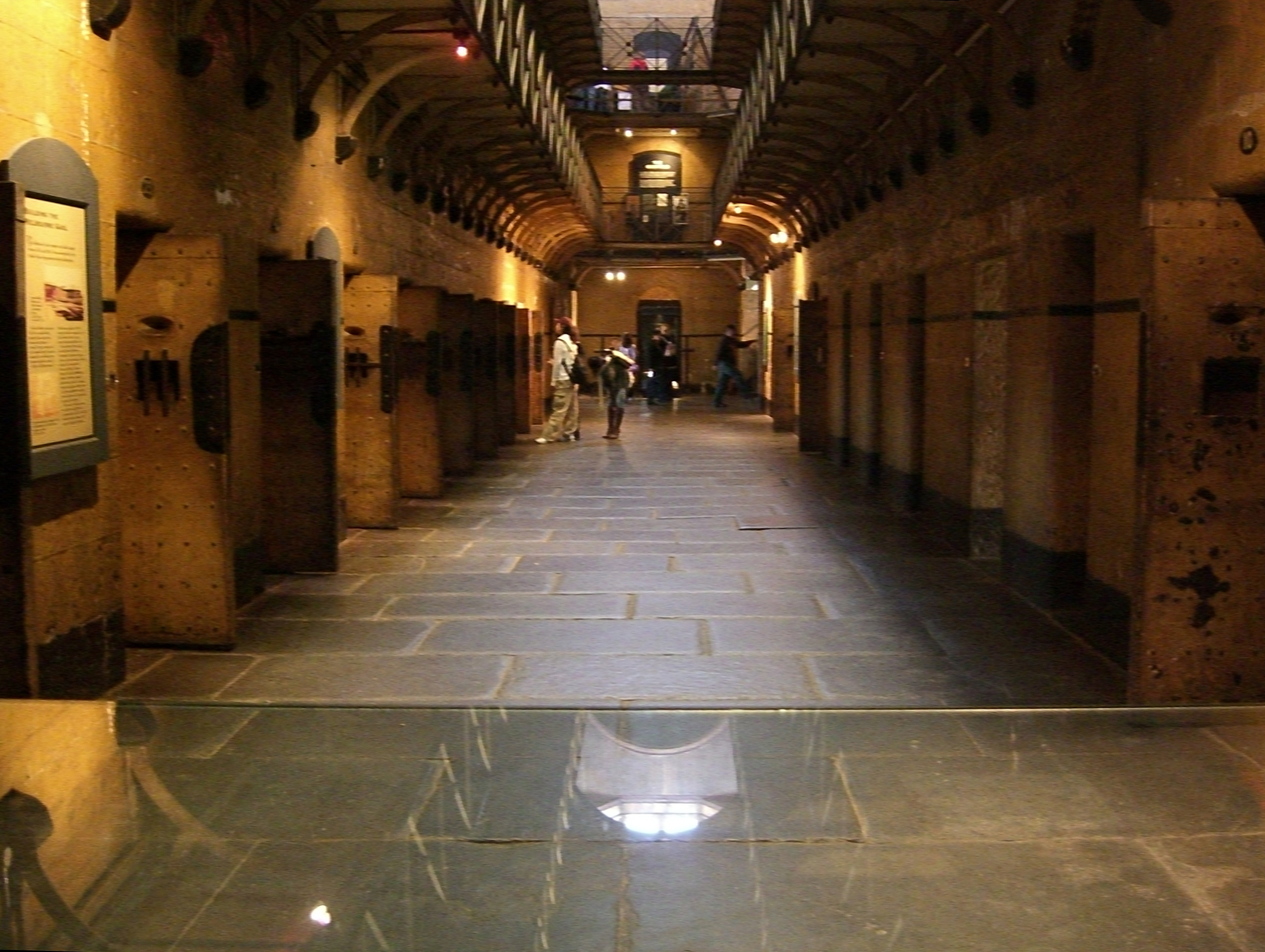
Inside the museum

In 1957, the National Trust of Australia listed the Old Melbourne Gaol on its heritage register, and a year later marked it as a site that needed to be preserved at all costs. Furthermore, in 1965, the Melbourne Junior Chamber of Commerce floated the idea of converting it into a museum, for the purposes of tourism. In 1972, the gaol was reopened as a public museum, under the management of the National Trust of Australia (Victoria).

As of 2010, the gaol is recognised as Victoria's oldest surviving penal establishment, and attracts approximately 140,000 visitors per year. The cells have been filled with information about individual prisoners, which also serve to illustrate the history of Melbourne itself.

In addition to historical information, it also includes various memorabilia; including death masks, an iron mask, and a pair of leather gloves designed to prevent inmates from practising self-abuse. Notably, it still includes Ned Kelly's death mask, pistol and replica of his suit of armour. In addition, the gaol had previously displayed the pencil used by Colin Ross to write a letter protesting his innocence, which he threw over the prison walls.

Operators also run several features, including the candlelit Hangman's Night Tour (with actors portraying prolific and brutal hangman Michael Gateley), and the daily Watch House Experience; an interactive performance in which visitors are treated as the prisoners would have been during its operation. In 2010, the Old Melbourne Gaol Crime and Justice Experience won the heritage and cultural tourism category at the Qantas Australian Tourism Awards in Hobart.

=== Ned Kelly's skull ===
A skull, long believed to be Ned Kelly's, was on display in the museum until it was stolen from a glass cabinet in 1978. Efforts have been taken by scientists and the government to determine the location of the skull, and whether it was authentic to begin with. It was reported that members of the public may have the remains of bones and teeth taken as souvenirs when graves were exhumed in 1929 for reburial at Pentridge Prison. A skull from a skeleton buried under the initials "E.K." was taken, with the apparent assumption that this stood for Edward Kelly. Special interest was directed to finding a photograph of former South Melbourne councillor Alex Talbot holding skull purported to be Ned Kelly's, and information on grave exhume contractor Lee of Lee and Dunn, or his family, who was tasked with delivering Kelly's skull to the governor.

In 2009, West Australian farmer Tom Baxter handed a skull to authorities, arguing that it was the one stolen from the gaol – while refusing to explain how he obtained it. Further examination confirmed that the Baxter skull was indeed the same one previously on display at the Gaol museum, however DNA testing in 2011 showed that it had not been Kelly's after all. Instead, it was suggested that it may have been that of executed murderer Ernest Knox, who was hanged 14 years after Kelly and also had the initials "E.K."

Former Pentridge Prison chaplain Father Peter Norden has stated that he believed the skull handed in could not belong to Kelly, and that it probably belonged to a woman, however later DNA testing showed that the skull was from a male. In 2010, there was further speculation that the skull actually belonged to Frederick Bailey Deeming, with the Victorian Institute of Forensic Medicine claiming that the skull is similar to both Kelly's and Deeming's death masks.

Ned Kelly's actual remains were later located in the grounds of Pentridge Prison, and confirmed by DNA comparison to living relatives, including a piece of his skull. This skull fragment showed saw marks, showing that Kelly's cranium had been sawn open and the brain removed for research after death.

== Use in Ned Kelly films ==
The films and TV productions Ned Kelly (1970), Trial of Ned Kelly (1977), The Last Outlaw (1980), Besieged: The Ned Kelly Story (2004), Ned's Head (2011) and True History of the Kelly Gang (2019) all used the interior of Old Melbourne Gaol as a set for the scene of Kelly's hanging. The scenes were filmed either at the actual location of Kelly's execution or, in the 2019 movie, nearby.
