= Frederick Bailey Deeming =

English-born Australian murderer and Jack the Ripper suspect (1853–1892)

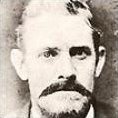
- Born: 30 July 1853; Ashby-de-la-Zouch, Leicestershire, England
- Died: 23 May 1892 (aged 38); Old Melbourne Gaol, Colony of Victoria
- Status: Executed by hanging
- Conviction: Murder
- Penalty: Death

Details
- Victims: 6, (possibly others in the Whitechapel murders)
- Span of crimes: 1891–1892
- Country: England and Australia
- Date apprehended: 12 March 1892

Frederick Bailey Deeming (30 July 1853 – 23 May 1892) was an English serial killer who was convicted and executed for the murder of his entire family in Rainhill, Merseyside, England, and his second wife in Melbourne, Australia. He is remembered today because he was suspected by some of being the notorious serial killer Jack the Ripper.

Less than three months elapsed between the discovery of the second victim's body in Melbourne, in March 1892, and Deeming's execution for her murder in May 1892; a remarkably short time by comparison to modern western legal standards. This was not only due to efficient police work, but also a result of the considerable international media interest Mather's murder attracted - Gurvich and Wray list numerous newspaper reports on the Windsor murder. Another factor was Deeming's behaviour in public, for while he often used different names, he usually drew attention to himself with behaviour variously described as aggressive, ostentatious, ingratiating and overly attentive to women.

Three copies of his death mask exist. One is on display at the Old Melbourne Gaol in Melbourne, where he was executed, whilst another is in the collection of the State Library Victoria alongside a cast of his right hand and photographs, books, newspaper articles and letters relating to the case. The third is in the collection of the Metropolitan Police's Crime Museum at New Scotland Yard in London - previously displayed there, it is now on display at the Metropolitan Police Museum in Sidcup.

== Life ==
=== First marriage ===
Frederick Bailey Deeming was born in Ashby-de-la-Zouch, Leicestershire, England, the son of brazier Thomas Deeming and his wife Ann (née Bailey). According to writers Maurice Gurvich and Christopher Wray, Deeming was a "difficult child." At age 16 he ran away to sea, and thereafter he began a long career of crime, largely thieving and obtaining money under false pretenses.

On 28 February 1881 he married Marie James, a slater's daughter one year Deeming's junior, at St Paul's, Tranmere. They lived briefly at Birkenhead, Cheshire, before leaving for Melbourne in 1882. Deeming's brother Alfred had married Marie's sister, Martha. Deeming and his wife, "a typical Welsh lass", moved to Australia in 1882, chiefly working in Sydney, but was also employed by John Danks, a Melbourne importer of plumbing and gas fitting supplies. Deeming's Melbourne employers regarded him as an excellent worker and extended him 200 pounds credit, supposedly to open a business in Rockhampton, Queensland. The money was never repaid.

Deeming is also known to have worked for a Sydney gasfitter, where he was charged with theft of brass fittings from his employer. He indignantly denied the theft, but the items were found at his home and he was sentenced to six weeks' imprisonment. Deeming pretended to faint when the sentence was pronounced. After his release from prison, Deeming continued to work in Sydney as a gasfitter until, in December 1887, he was again committed for trial, now on a charge of fraudulent insolvency. He disappeared from New South Wales while on bail. By 1886 Deeming and Marie had two Australian-born daughters, Bertha (born around 1881) and Marie or Mary (born around 1884) - they were later followed by Sidney (born around 1886) and Leala (18 months old at the time of her death).

=== South Africa and England ===
In 1888 Deeming's brothers Alfred and Walter learned that he and his family were returning to England "with a considerable fortune." He was then active in Cape Town in 1888–1889. These journeys to South Africa were possibly without his family - his exact movements at this time are unclear and it appears he returned to Birkenhead at least once. Deeming was known to have been involved in conducting a Transvaal diamond mine swindle in 1889. His return to England via the steamship Yumna was well-remembered by the captain and passengers because of his ostentatious display of jewellery and money, and his unwanted attention to some of the female passengers.

Deeming had arrived at Hull by November 1889, lodging in the nearby town of Beverley. Here he passed himself off as "a retired sheep farmer" named Harry Lawson from Mount House Farm, Rockhampton, Queensland, living on 1,500 pounds a year. He wooed Helen Matheson, the 21-year-old daughter of his landlady, and married her, bigamously, on 18 February 1890. About a month later, after a honeymoon in the south of England, Deeming suddenly disappeared, taking his expensive gifts to Matheson with him. Deeming's wife and extended family had heard of his bigamous marriage to Matheson, according to Gurvich and Wray.

Deeming was later found to have then visited Marie and the four children in Birkenhead. He apparently gave Marie several hundred pounds, announced he was leaving for South America and told her he would send for her and the children once he was settled. Before leaving he conducted another swindle at a jeweler's in Hull. He was arrested for this offence on arrival at Montevideo and extradited back to England on a charge of "obtaining goods by false pretenses" being sentenced to nine months prison.

=== Rainhill ===
On his release from prison in July 1891, Deeming headed to the Liverpool area, settling into a hotel in the village of Rainhill under the name Albert Williams. A mysterious woman (almost certainly his wife Marie) who appeared at the hotel was dismissed as his "sister", visiting before she left for Port Said. Deeming then took a lease on Dinham Villa, a house in Rainhill, supposedly on behalf of a military friend, a certain "Colonel Brookes". However, Deeming himself took up residence at Dinham Villa, while a woman and several children were seen at the house and were again dismissed as merely his "sister and her children" visiting, who had "since returned home".

Deeming cut the throats of Marie and all their children at Rainhill on or about 26 July (or possibly as late as 11 August) 1891, by which time he had already begun courting Emily Lydia Mather, the daughter of a widowed local shopkeeper and stationer, Mrs. Dove Mather. He hid the bodies under the Villa's floor and soon afterwards complained that its drains were defective, and that the kitchen floor needed to be replaced. He closely supervised the work on the floor. Deeming married Mather on 22 September 1891 under the false identity of Albert Oliver Williams at St Ann's Church, Rainhill, claiming to be son of a Colonel Albert William Williams.

Deeming seems to have led his brothers and Marie's sister to believe that Marie and the children were in Brighton on a holiday, which then led them to assume they were overseas again. Deeming also made several visits to Birkenhead to reassure Martha that her sister and the children were well. Detection of the murders was also obstructed by Deeming's lease (as Williams) on Dinham Villa, which stipulated that the house should not be sold or re-let for six months, because of the imminent arrival of Colonel Brookes and/or Williams' sister. The lease also allowed Williams to resurface the concrete floor.

=== Windsor murder ===
In November 1891, Deeming (still using the name Williams) took Mather to Australia in the German steamship Kaiser Wilhelm II - she talked to fellow passengers about her family in Rainhill during the long voyages and their evidence would later prove vital. Deeming's behaviour as Mr. Williams also attracted considerable attention during the voyage. When interviewed later by the police, many passengers stated they "detested Williams, [but] all agreed he had treated his wife in a loving and considerate manner".

They arrived in Melbourne on 15 December 1891. Deeming rented a house on Andrew Street in Windsor, a suburb of the city. He paid a month's rent in advance, giving the name Mr. Drewn. The owner, nearby butcher John Stamford, had been happy to rent to the man, because of his air of respectability, and at first, had not even known the man's name. As was testified to at the inquest into Mather's death, early in 1892 a man (answering Mr. Williams's description and then staying at the Cathedral Hotel in Swanston Street in the city as Mr. Duncan) had auctioned a variety of household goods, possibly wedding presents, in the city.

On 24 December or early on 25 December 1891, he fractured Mather's skull in several places and cut her throat, the latter deemed to be the most likely cause of death at her autopsy. He buried her under the hearthstone of one of the bedrooms, covering the body with cement and leaving the property very soon afterwards. As emerged at the inquest, he wrote an affectionate letter (as Albert Williams) to Mather's mother several days after Mather's murder. Before or after the murder he also found time to approach Holt's Matrimonial Agency (as Duncan), wishing to meet a young lady with matrimonial intentions, and to swindle a local Melbourne jeweller.

=== Jack the Ripper suspect ===
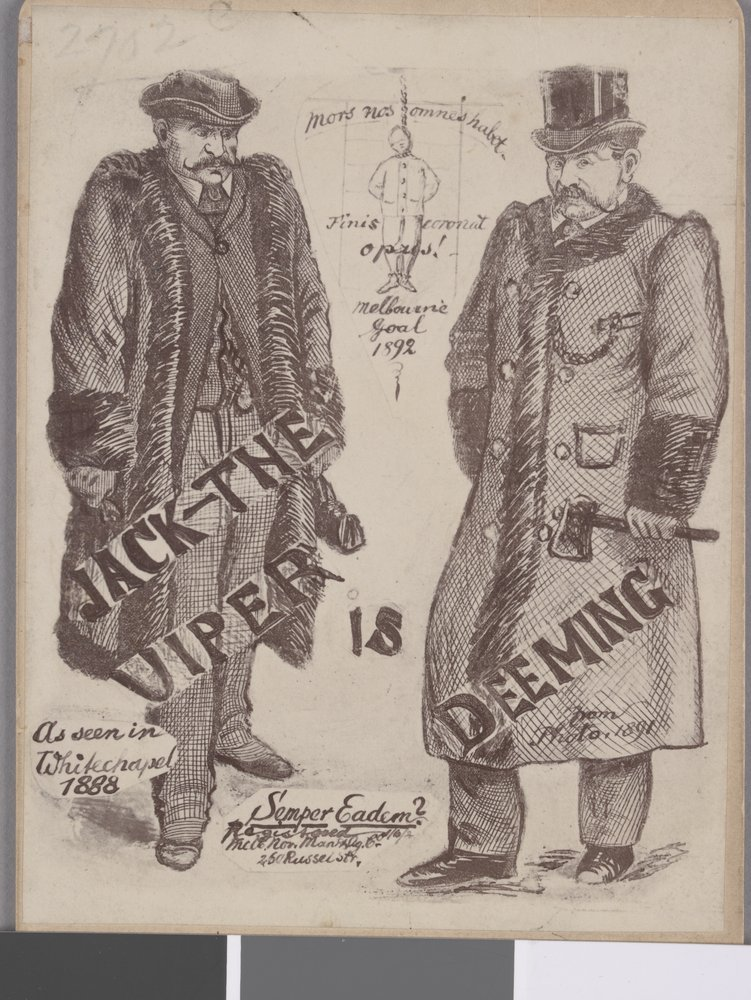
19th-century illustration comparing Deeming and 'Jack the Viper' of Whitechapel

On 3 March 1892 a prospective tenant of the Windsor house complained of "a disagreeable smell" in the second bedroom. The owner and estate agent later raised the hearthstone to investigate whereupon the smell became so overpowering "they found themselves barely able to breathe". The police were called and Mather's body found, with a postmortem following on 4 March.

Considerable publicity surrounded the discovery. On 5 March The Age newspaper had connected the murder to the Whitechapel murders by 'Jack the Ripper' in east London from August to November 1888:

From the outset a suspicion of insanity is almost suggested and a tinge of the Whitechapel murders is hinted. The body hacked and mangled, the cool manner in which the cementing was carried out, the taking a house etc, the laborious obliteration of all traces of the crime – all these things suggest the malevolence and craft which can scarcely accompany the sane murderer, no matter how callous and brutal.

As Australians struggled to comprehend the savageness of the Windsor murder, significant press speculation grew, suggesting Deeming was also responsible for the Whitechapel murders. The speculation was also found in overseas reports of the case. For example, on 17 March The New York Times reported the story with the headlines:

Perhaps Jack the Ripper. The Startling discovery made in Liverpool. A Man arrested in Australia.

This responded to the possibility that Deeming may have been in England at the time of the Whitechapel murders. In 1912 Kreitmayer's in Melbourne produced waxworks showing Deeming burying Mather and commented that it was suspected he was "identical with Jack the Ripper" - this probably reflected widespread public opinion on the point by that time.

As of 1892 the Metropolitan Police officially dismissed Deeming as a suspect of the Whitechapel murders, since they had evidence that he was either in jail or in South Africa at the time of the murders. However, speculation that Deeming was Jack the Ripper continues today - The Last Podcast on the Left still lists him as one of two "reasonable" Jack the Ripper suspects.

Forensic researcher and former Metropolitan Police detective Robin Napper worked with a team of researchers and concluded that most of the evidence leads to Deeming as Jack the Ripper. In a Discovery Channel documentary in 2011 Napper argued that the Crime Museum's past display of a copy of Deeming's death mask as that of "Jack the Ripper" shows that the police had always considered him a prime suspect.

=== Investigation and capture ===
From clues found at the vacant Andrew Street house and from information provided by local tradespeople, including Stamford and his agent, a local laundress, an ironmonger who sold Deeming cement and several carriers, investigating Victoria Police sergeants William Considine and Henry Cawsey were able to trace the recently arrived Mr. Williams to the Kaiser Wilhelm II. They were then able to interview other passengers, who gave corroborating descriptions of Mr. Williams and Mather and his apparently loving behaviour towards her. They also passed on her mentions of her family in Rainhill. This gave the police several leads and a very good description of Mr. Williams, which they circulated to other Australian colonies, but at this stage, his real identity was still unknown.

In the meantime, on or about 12 January 1892, Deeming had travelled to Sydney, and was now using the name Baron Swanston. During the voyage and in Sydney Deeming met and courted Kate Rounsefell. He told Rounsefell that if she agreed to become his wife, "she would never regret it, and would always congratulate herself on having entered into matrimony with him". After a whirlwind romance, during which Deeming gave Rounsefell several items of what was later shown to be stolen Melbourne jewellery, Rounsefell consented to marry Baron Swanston. Having also agreed to follow him to Western Australia, Rounsefell and Deeming parted company. By means of forged testimonials, Deeming had obtained a position at a mine at Southern Cross.

On 22 January 1892 Baron Swanston departed for Fremantle. Again, Deeming as Baron Swanston made a name for himself on the ship, boasting of his wealth and position in society. He made approaches to Miss Maude Beech, a young woman in the care of her uncle and aunt, Mr. and Mrs. Wakeley. In this case, Deeming's charm came to nothing. Mr. Wakeley told Swanston; "I may tell you plainly, that I don't believe your stories and I am not in the habit of allowing men of your class to enter my family circle." Once settled at Southern Cross, Deeming maintained a barrage of pleas to Rounsefell, writing on 8 February; "Don't keep me waiting dear. If you love me half as much as I love you, you would not keep me waiting a day". (Note: For the full text of this letter. Gurvich and Wray also argue that the suggestion Deeming purchased cement at South Cross, in preparation for Rounsefell's arrival, is incorrect.)

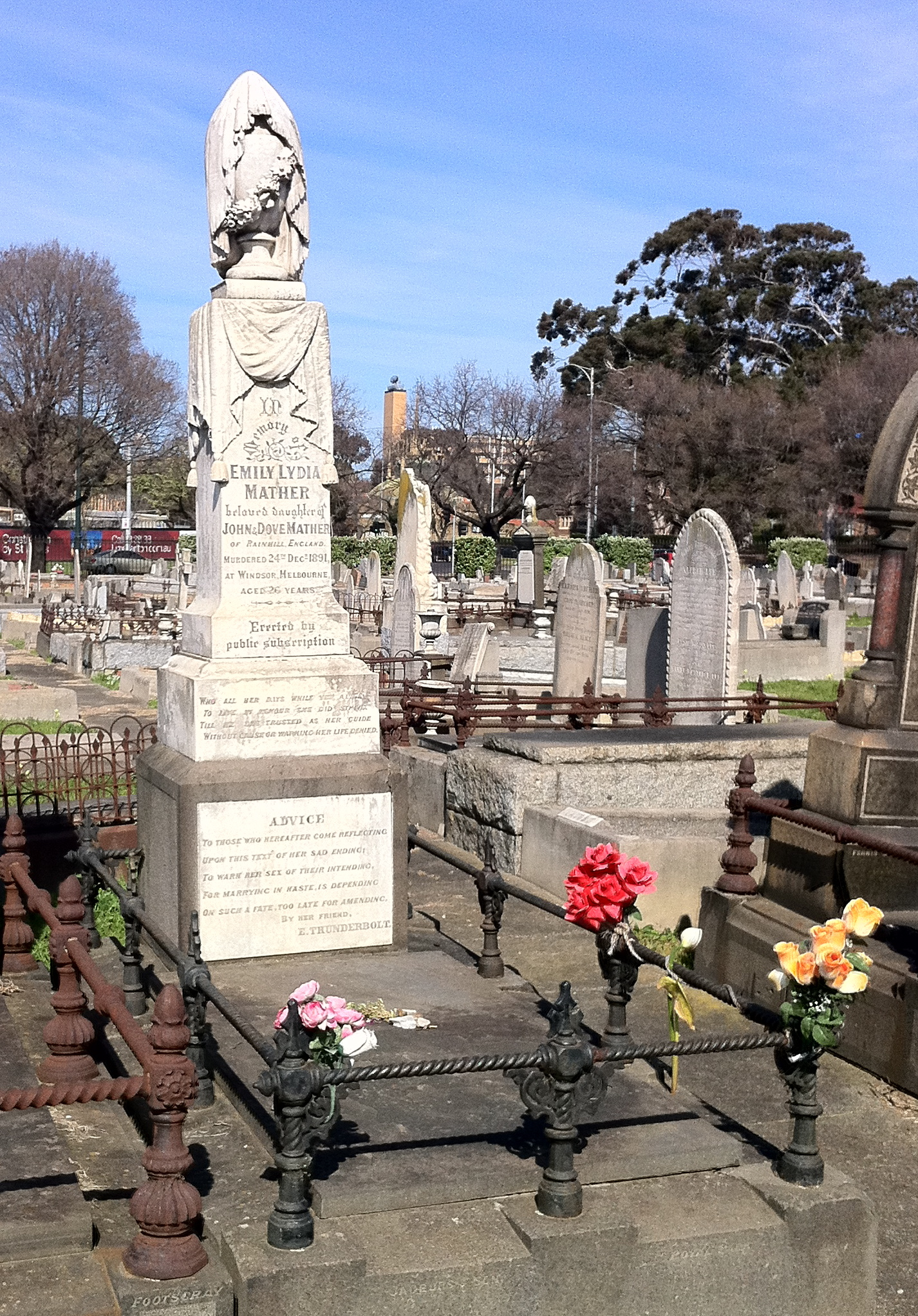
Grave of Emily Mather, Melbourne General Cemetery

Police were closing in, however, and following telegrams by Victoria Police to Western Australia, Deeming was arrested at Southern Cross on 12 March 1892. He began by denying he was Deeming but later said "I think I know the party who has been murdered. I don't believe anyone would have the heart to murder a girl like that". Found in his possession at the time of the arrest were a number of Mather's belongings, including her prayer book.

An English journalist working for the Melbourne Argus was the first to approach Mather's mother in Rainhill and deliver the news of her daughter's murder - his account first appeared in The Argus on 14 March 1892:

Mrs. Mather had not heard of any murder in Melbourne [or]…the fate of her daughter. When I told her of the tragedy, she fainted.

Following publicity surrounding the discovery of Mather's body at Windsor, investigations at Rainhill revealed the decomposing bodies of Marie Deeming and the four children. At an inquest held at Rainhill on 18 March 1892, Deeming's brothers identified Marie and gave some accounts of his activities. At about the same time as Deeming was being returned to Melbourne, news of the discovery of the Rainhill murders in England arrived in Australia.

A family acquaintance of the Mather family, Edward Thunderbolt, Melbourne's Inspector of Public Nuisances, arranged a public subscription, and erected a monument to Emily Mather at Melbourne General Cemetery. (Note: The monument still stands and reads: EMILY LYDIA MATHER beloved daughter of JOHN&DOVE MATHER of RAINHILL, ENGLAND.MURDERED 24 December 1891, AT WINDSOR, MELBOURNE.AGED 26 YEARS. Erected by public subscription. Who all her days while yet alive, To live in honour she did strive. Till he she trusted as her guide, without cause or warning her life denied. ADVICE; To those who hereafter come reflecting, Upon this text of her sad ending. To warn her sex of their intending. For marrying in haste, is depending, On such a fate, too late for amending. By her friend, E.THUNDERBOLT.)

=== Trial and execution ===
Furious demonstrations against Deeming were made on the journey to Perth, and again on the way to Albany. Deeming was tried at Melbourne Supreme Court on 25 April 1892. The prosecution case was conducted by Robert Walsh, Q.C. Alfred Deakin, his counsel (later Prime Minister of Australia), tried to mount a plea of insanity. The defence also questioned the impact of newspaper reporting of Deeming on the jury.

Perhaps wishing to aid the defence of insanity, Deeming also claimed to have caught syphilis in London and to have received visitations from his mother's spirit, which urged his actions. Before the jury retired, Deeming made a "lengthy,... rambling, speech of self-justification". He repeated a story he had told police that Emily had "run off with another man". "That is my one comfort...knowing that she is not dead".

Deeming was found guilty as charged, however. Deeming spent the last days writing his autobiography and poetry; "The Jury listened well to the yarn I had to tell, But they sent me straight to hell." He also spent time talking to the Church of England ministers, to whom he supposedly confessed. The sentence of the court was confirmed by the Executive Council on 9 May 1892 and the judicial committee of the Privy Council refused leave to appeal on 19 May 1892. Deeming was hanged at 10:01 am on 23 May 1892, he weighed 143 pounds (65 kg), 14 pounds (6.4 kg) less than when he entered prison. The autobiography which Deeming wrote in jail was destroyed.

== See also ==
- List of serial killers by country
- Wilful Murder (1892) - stage play based on the murder
- A Crying in the Night - radio play based on Deeming
- "Was This Jack The Ripper?". The Sydney Morning Herald. No. 36, 197. 1953 article by C. R. Bradish, referring to him as Frederick William Deeming.
