= List of Queensland University of Technology people =

This is a list of Queensland University of Technology people, including notable past and present alumni and faculty of the Queensland University of Technology (QUT).

== Alumni ==
=== Humanities ===
==== Arts ====
- Ball Park Music, band
- Sam Campbell, comedian
- Conrad Coleby, actor
- Gigi Edgley, actress
- Ben Hunter, comedian
- Roma Egan, dance teacher
- Hayley Elsaesser, Canadian fashion designer
- Gyton Grantley, actor
- Tai Hara, actor, presenter
- Darren Hayes, singer
- Michelle Law, writer
- Deborah Mailman, actress
- Anna McGahan, actress
- Kierin Meehan, choreographer, teacher, children's author
- Kate Miller-Heidke, musician
- Zoe Naylor, actress
- Jason Nelson, artist
- Daniel Riley, dancer and choreographer
- Josh Thomas, comedian
- Brenton Thwaites, actor
- Kalju Tonuma, record producer, audio artist
- Sheikh Haikel, actor from Singapore
- Senna Hegde, director
- Yang Jin-Woo, South Korean actor

==== Journalism and media ====
- Tracey Curro, journalist and communications manager
- Abbie Chatfield, TV/media personality
- Ben Davis, drive presenter on 4BC in Brisbane
- Nick Etchells, senior reporter for Seven News in Melbourne
- Natasha Exelby, 10 News First presenter
- Ben Fajzullin, journalist
- Sharyn Ghidella, journalist and Channel Seven presenter
- Peter Greste, correspondent for Al Jazeera
- Spencer Howson, ABC radio presenter
- Lisy Kane, video game producer
- Emmy Kubainski, former co-presenter of Nine News Perth
- Leila McKinnon, journalist for Nine Network
- Paul Osborne, Canberra bureau chief for AAP newswire
- Alanah Pearce, video game writer and former journalist
- Leigh Sales, host of the ABC's 7.30 Report
- Karl Stefanovic, journalist and presenter

==== Literature, writing and poetry ====
- Diane Cilento, author, actress, dramatist and playwright; founder of the Creative Industries Artist in Residence Program

==== Philosophy and theology ====
- Philip Freier, Anglican Archbishop of Melbourne
- Ken Ham, founder of Answers in Genesis, Creation Museum and Creation Ministries International

=== Government ===
==== Politicians ====
- Peter Beattie, former Premier of Queensland
- Jarrod Bleijie MP, Former Attorney-General of Queensland and Minister for Justice
- Sue Boyce, Liberal member of the Australian Senate
- Alvin Cheng Kam-moon, Hong Kong student activist and founder of Student Front
- Steven Ciobo MP, Federal Member for Moncrieff
- Yvette D'Ath MP, Federal Member for Petrie and Attorney-General of Queensland
- Peter Dutton MP, Federal Member for Dickson; Minister for Immigration and Border Protection
- Teresa Gambaro MP, Federal Member for Brisbane
- Linda Lavarch, former Queensland Attorney-General
- Michael Lavarch, former Australian Attorney-General
- Joe Ludwig, ALP member of the Australian Senate
- Graham Perrett MP, Federal Member for Moreton
- Keith Pitt MP, Federal Member for Hinkler
- Bernie Ripoll MP, member of the Australian House of Representatives, representing the Division of Oxley
- Stuart Robert MP, Federal Member for Fadden
- Wayne Swan MP, Federal Member for Lilley and former Treasurer of Australia
- Chris Trevor MP, Federal Member for Flynn
- Kate Jones MP

=== Law ===
- Helen Bowskill, Chief Justice of Queensland
- Tim Carmody, former Chief Justice of Queensland
- Kerry Carrington, QUT research professor and former head of the School of Justice
- Leanne Clare SC, Judge of Brisbane District Court of Queensland
- Michael Lavarch, Professor Emeritus and former Executive Dean of the Faculty of Law
- Dinesh Palipana, quadriplegic doctor and lawyer
- Brian Fitzgerald, specialist research professor of law
- Nathan Jarro, judge of the Queensland District Court and Queensland's first Indigenous judge.
- John Pyke, physicist and former QUT law lecturer
- Bryan Horrigan, former QUT associate professor

=== Medicine and sciences ===
- Steve Lawrence, computer scientist

=== Other ===
- Georgia Sheehan, diver
- Roman Quaedvlieg, former Commissioner of the Australian Border Force 2015–18
- Amira Karroum, jihadist killed in Syrian Civil War
- Florence Bundu, former chairperson of the Papua New Guinea Olympic Committee, sportswoman and activist

== Notable faculty ==
- Axel Bruns, Professor of Communication and Media Studies
- Jean Burgess, Professor of Digital Media
- Ray Chan, Adjunct Professor, School of Nursing
- Peter Corke, Distinguished Professor of Robotics
- Greg Creed, CEO of Yum! Brands
- Stuart Cunningham, Distinguished Emeritus Professor of Communication and Media Studies
- Brian Fitzgerald
- Michael Gabbett, Associate Professor of Biomedical Sciences and Clinical Geneticist
- Dennis Gibson
- Lyn Griffiths, Distinguished Professor and Director of the Centre for Genomics and Personalised Health
- Jennifer MacLeod, Professor, physicist and surface scientist
- Colleen Nelson, Chair of Prostate Cancer Research
- Dale Nyholt, Professor in the School of Biomedical Science
- Chris Sarra,
- Arun Sharma, Distinguished Emeritus Professor
- T.J. Thomson, a senior lecturer in the School of Communication
- Mahinda Vilathgamuwa, Professor of Power Systems
- Chelsea Watego, Professor of Indigenous Health
- Patsy Yates, Distinguished Professor and Executive Dean of the Faculty of Health
- Marek Kowalkiewicz, Professor and Chair in Digital Economy
- Susan Danby, Professor of Education

== See also ==
- Category:Queensland University of Technology alumni
- Category:Academic staff of the Queensland University of Technology
- Queensland University of Technology Student Guild
