= Lists of Australians =

Flag of Australia

Lists of Australians covers selected notable Australian people organised by awards and honours, occupation, ethnicity, sports and other qualities.

== Australians of the Year ==
- List of Australian of the Year Award recipients
- List of Senior Australian of the Year Award recipients
- List of Young Australian of the Year Award recipients
- List of Australian Local Hero Award recipients

== Awards and honours ==
- List of Australian Victoria Cross recipients
- List of knights and dames of the Order of Australia
- List of companions of the Order of Australia
- Recipients of Australian civil awards and decorations

== Education ==
- List of Australian university leaders
- List of University of Adelaide people
- List of Australian National University people
- List of Flinders University people
- List of University of South Australia people
- List of La Trobe University people
- List of Macquarie University people
- List of Queensland University of Technology people
- List of University of Melbourne people
- List of Monash University people
- List of University of New England people
- List of University of New South Wales people
- List of University of Queensland people
- List of University of Sydney people
- List of University of Western Australia people
- List of famous Old Sydneians

== Entertainment and culture ==
- List of Australian architects
- List of Australian composers
- List of Australian film directors
- List of Australian hip hop musicians
- List of Australian novelists
- List of Australian poets
- List of Australian Idol semi finalists
- List of Australian television presenters
- List of Australian women artists
- List of Australian women photographers
- List of Indigenous Australian musicians
- List of Indigenous Australian visual artists
- List of Indigenous Australian writers

== Geography and ethnicity ==
- List of Chinese Australians
- List of Sri Lankan Australians
- List of Hungarian Australians
- List of Turkish Australians
- List of Italian Australians
- Lists of Indigenous Australians
- List of Pakistani Australians
- List of people from Adelaide
- List of Noongar people
- List of people from Melbourne
- List of Queenslanders
- List of people from Wollongong
- List of VFL/AFL players by ethnicity
- List of Oceanian Jews

== Law and crime ==
- List of Australian criminals
- List of Australian politicians convicted of crimes
- List of Australians in international prisons
- List of judges of the Supreme Court of the Australian Capital Territory
- List of justices of the High Court of Australia
- Lists of people legally executed in Australia:
  - List of people legally executed in New South Wales
  - List of people legally executed on Norfolk Island
  - List of people legally executed in the Northern Territory
  - List of people legally executed in Queensland
  - List of people legally executed in South Australia
  - List of people legally executed in Tasmania
  - List of people legally executed in Victoria
  - List of people legally executed in Western Australia

== Literature ==
- List of Indigenous Australian writers
- List of Australian novelists
- List of Australian poets
- List of Australian women writers

== Politics ==
- Father of the Australian Senate
- Father of the Australian House of Representatives
- Father of the Australian Parliament
- List of Australian ministers
- List of Australian opposition leaders
- List of Australian Greens parliamentarians
- List of Indigenous Australians in politics and public service
- List of ambassadors of Australia to Iran
- List of ambassadors of Australia to the United Nations
- List of ambassadors of Australia to the United States
- List of high commissioners of Australia to the United Kingdom
- List of the first women appointed to Australian judicial positions
- List of ambassadors and high commissioners of Australia
- List of prime ministers of Australia
- List of longest-serving members of the Parliament of Australia
- People who have served in both Houses of the Australian Parliament

=== Mayors and lord mayors ===
- List of mayors and lord mayors of Adelaide
- List of mayors and lord mayors of Brisbane
- List of mayors and lord mayors of Hobart
- List of mayors and lord mayors of Melbourne
- List of mayors and lord mayors of Perth
- List of mayors, lord mayors and administrators of Sydney

=== Premiers ===
- Premier of New South Wales
- Premier of South Australia
- Premier of Queensland
- Premier of Tasmania
- Premier of Western Australia
- Premier of Victoria

== Religion ==
- List of Anglican bishops of Sydney
- Catholic Bishops and Archbishops of Perth, Western Australia
- Catholic Bishops and Archbishops of Sydney

== Sport ==
- List of Australian Test cricketers
  - Australian national cricket captains
  - List of Australian Test wicket-keepers
  - List of Australian Test batsmen who have scored over 5000 Test runs
- List of Australian ODI cricketers
- List of Australian Twenty20 International cricketers
- Australian Test cricket umpires
- List of Australian rules football and cricket players
- List of Australian Football League umpires
- Australian Rugby League's Team of the Century
- List of Australian Football League coaches
- List of Australian Winter Olympians
- List of VFL/AFL players by ethnicity
- List of players from Australia in Major League Baseball

== Miscellaneous ==
- Australian Living Treasures
- List of Indigenous Australians associated with European colonisation of Australia
- List of Australian businesspersons

== See also ==
- Australian people
- Lists of Australian people
  - Lists of Australian people by populated place
- Lists of Australian military personnel
- Australia-related lists
