= List of Turkish Australians =

This is a list of notable Australian Turks.

== Academia ==
- Vecihi Başarın, historian
- Serdar Kuyucak, associate professor at the University of Sydney

== Activists ==
- Pembe Mentesh, campaigner and supporter of women's rights (Turkish Cypriot origin)

== Arts and literature ==
- Mutlu Çerkez, conceptual artist (Turkish Cypriot origin)
- Filiz Behaettin, author, speaker (Turkish Cypriot origin)
- Mertim Gokalp, artist

== Business ==
- Bulent Hass Dellal, AO, director and chairman of the Special Broadcasting Service (Turkish Cypriot origin)
- John Ilhan, founder of Crazy John's mobile phone retail chain and the richest Australian under 40 years old in 2003
- Huss Mustafa, OAM, senior executive at Commonwealth Bank; established the Australian Turkish Business Council (Turkish Cypriot origin)

== Cinema and television ==
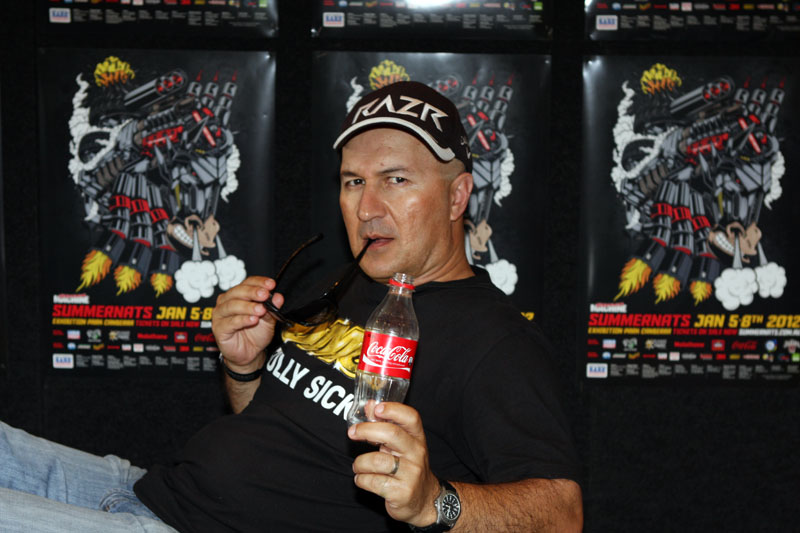
Tahir Bilgiç.

- Yasemin Allen, actor
- Deniz Akdeniz, actor
- Tahir Bilgiç, comedian, film and television actor
- Serhat Caradee, filmmaker
- Didem Erol, actress
- David Gulasi, social media celebrity
- Ayten Kuyululu, film director
- Sinem Saban, film writer, producer, director, and human rights activist (Turkish Cypriot origin)
- Serpil Senelmis, broadcaster

== Fashion and design ==
- Leyla Acaroglu, designer, sustainability innovator, and educator
- Şener Besim, jeweller
- Abdulla Elmaz, surrealist fashion photographer

== Food ==
- Ibrahim Kasif, celebrity chef (Turkish Cypriot origin)
- Somer Sivrioğlu, celebrity chef
- Ismail Tosun, celebrity chef (Turkish and Turkish Cypriot origin)

== Music ==
- Albert Arlen, AM, pianist
- Işın Çakmakcıoğlu, violinist and a member of the Melbourne Symphony Orchestra (Turkish German origin)
- Maya Jupiter, rapper (Turkish mother)
- Deniz Tek, founding member of Australian rock group Radio Birdman (Turkish father)

== Politics ==
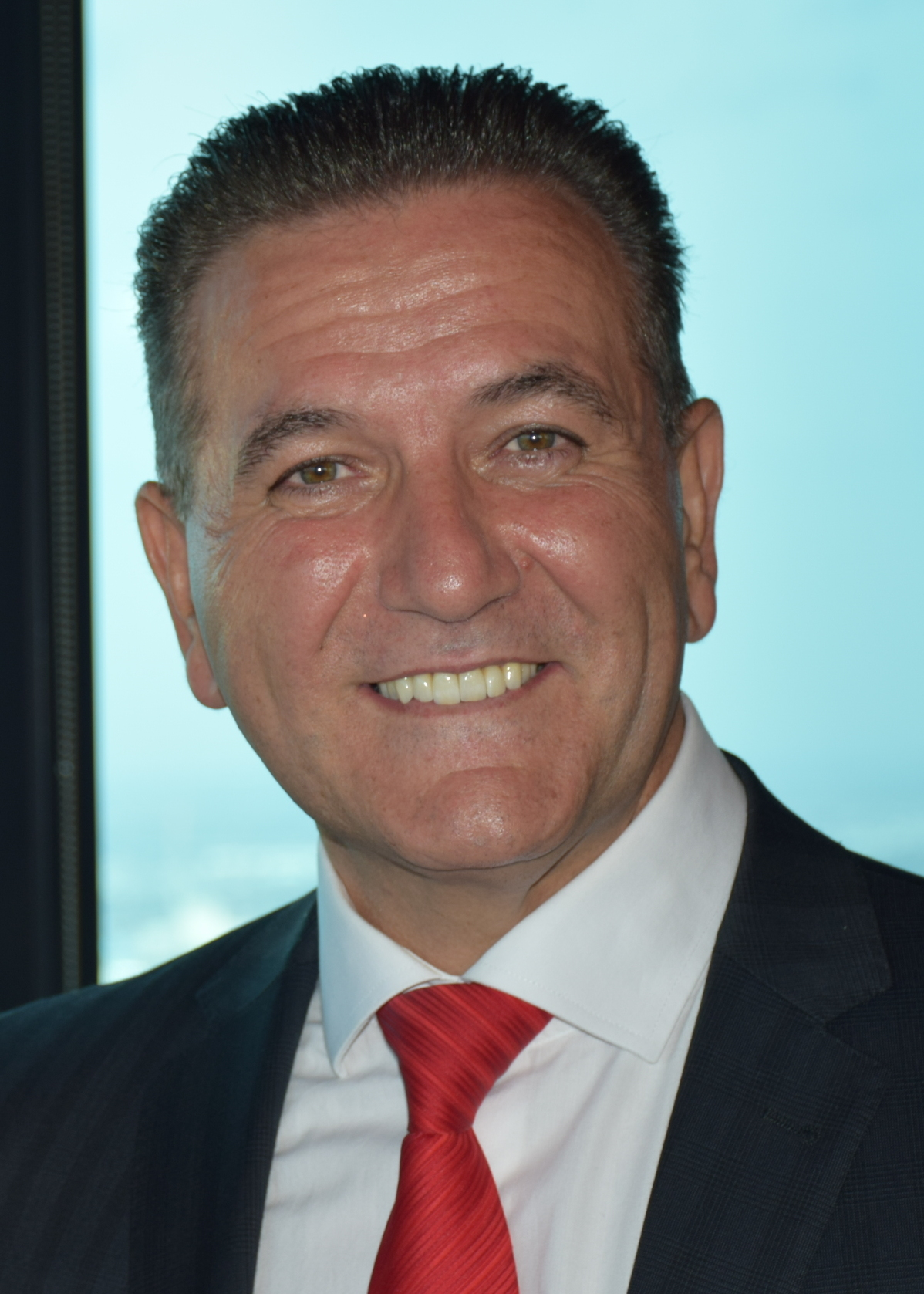
John Eren.

- John Eren, member of the Labour party
- Tayfun Eren, former member of the Labour party, and first Turkish-born politician to be elected to a Parliament in Australia
- Hutch Hussein, State President of the Victorian branch of the Australian Labor Party (ALP) between 2016 and 2019 (Turkish Cypriot origin)
- Adem Somyurek, member of the Labour party
- Nazlı Süleyman, member of the Labour party (Turkish Cypriot origin)
- Mehmet Tillem, member of the Labour party

== Sports ==
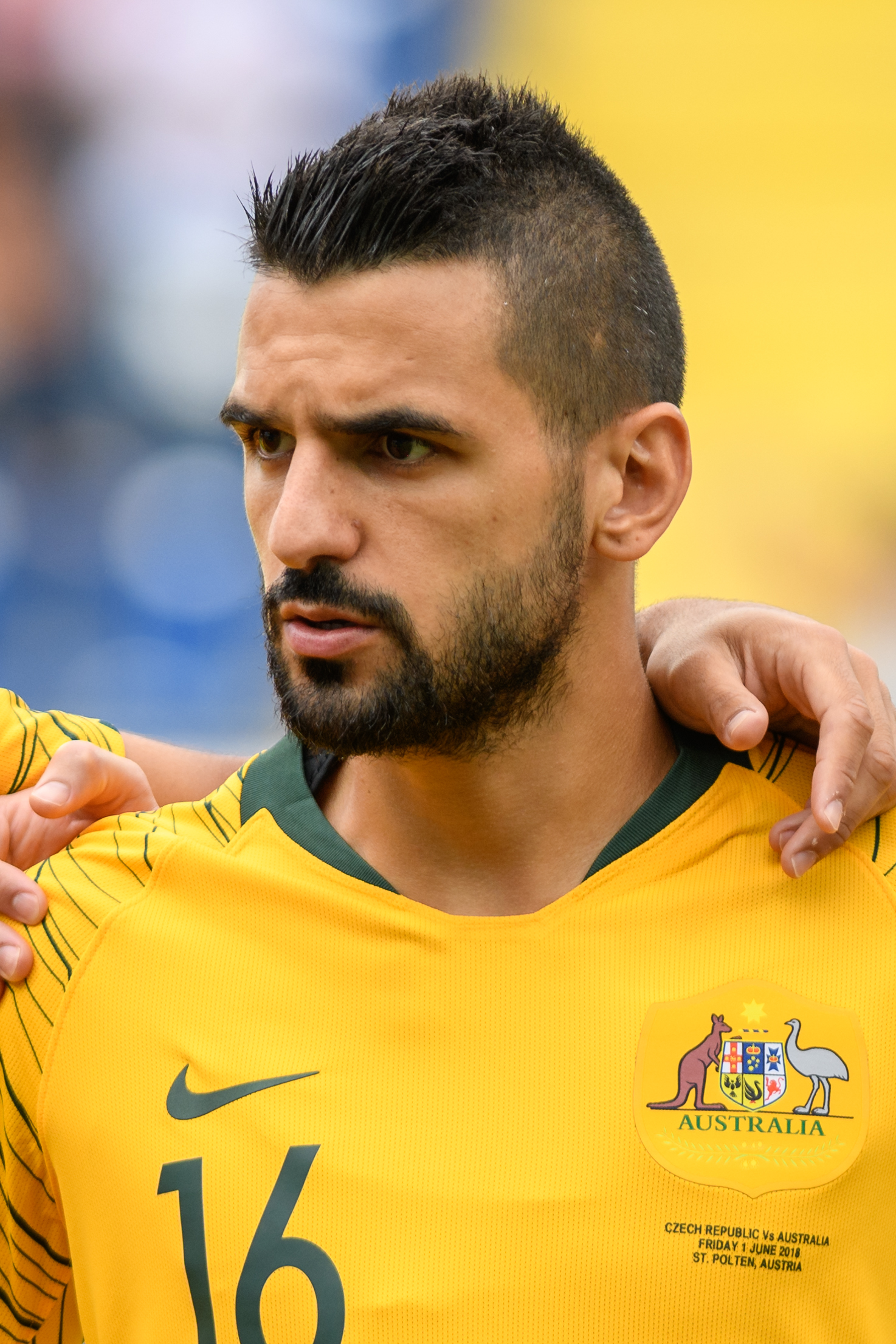
Aziz Behich.

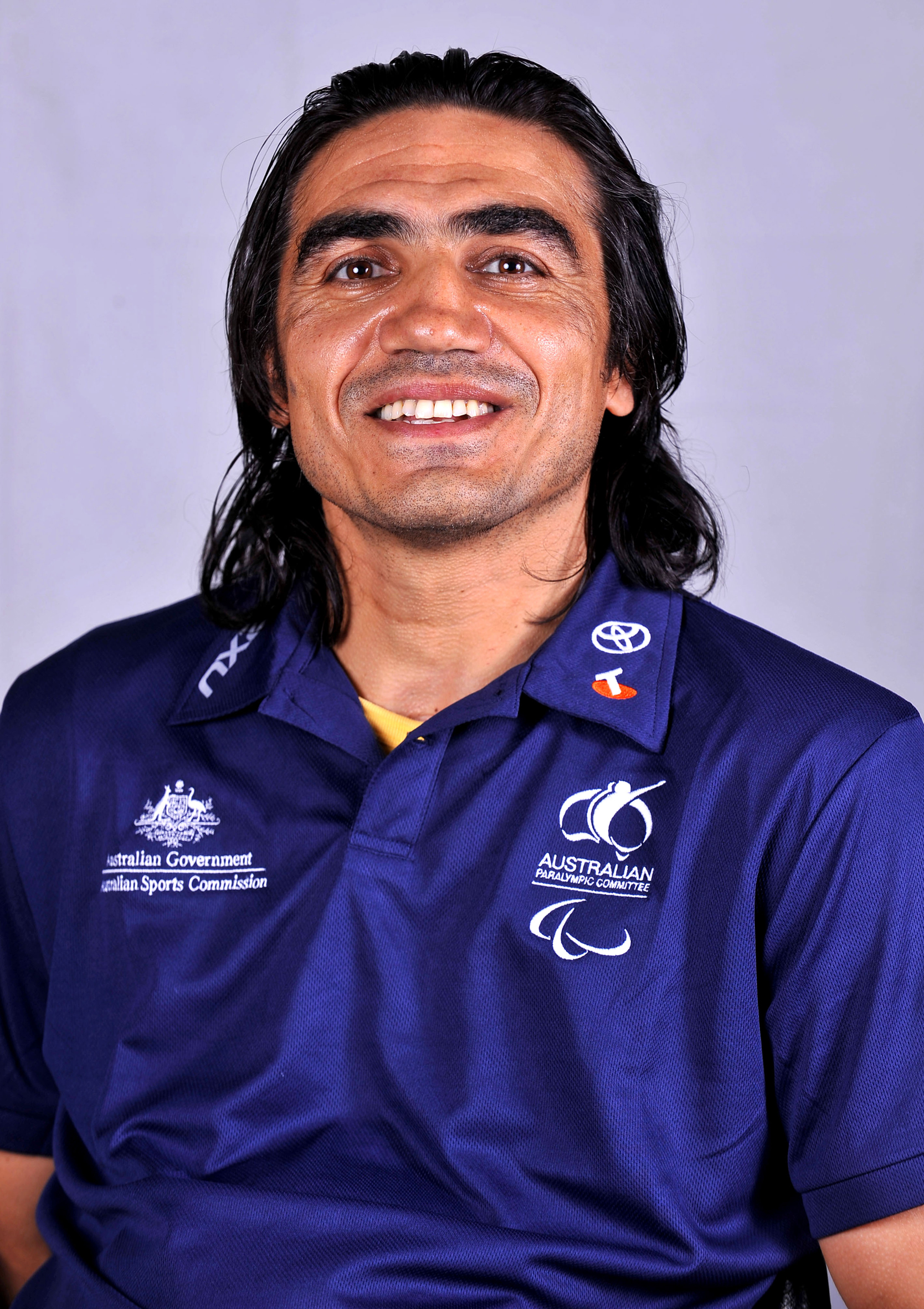
Nazim Erdem.

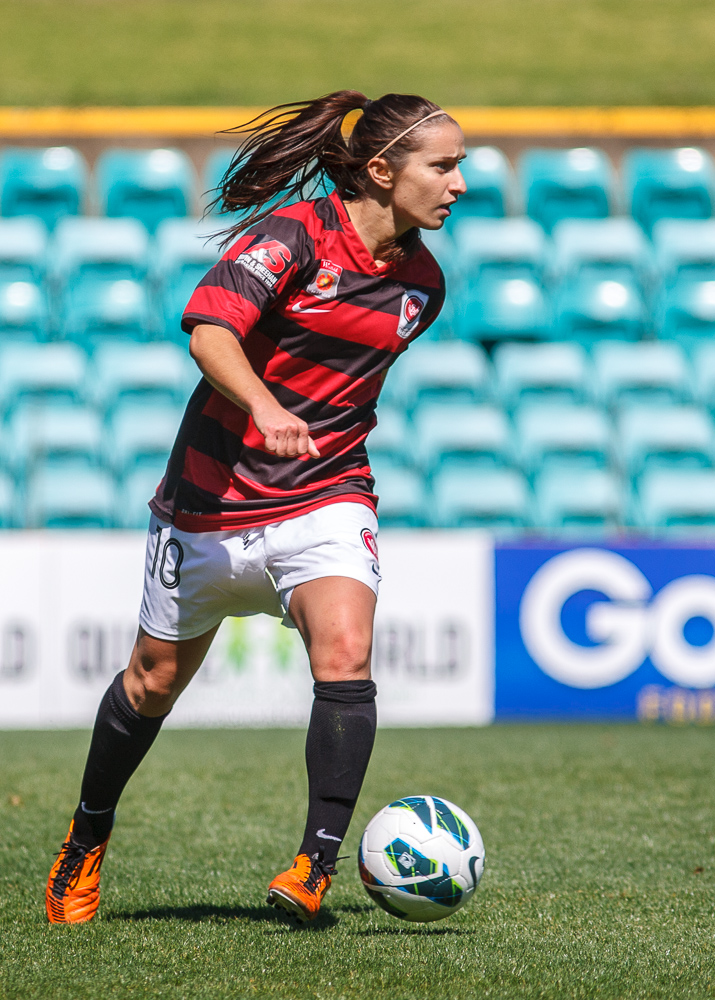
Servet Uzunlar.

- Jack Aziz, Australian rules football player (Turkish Cypriot origin)
- Tansel Başer, football player
- Aziz Behich, football player (Turkish Cypriot origin)
- Kerem Bulut, football player
- Tayfun Devrimol, football player
- Taylin Duman, Australian rules football player
- Nazim Erdem, OAM, wheelchair rugby Paralympic gold and silver medalist
- İsyan Erdoğan, football player
- Şeyma Erenli, football player
- Genburten,
- Aytek Genc, football player
- Errol Gulden, Australian rules football player
- Emre Guler, rugby player
- Ersan Gülüm, football player
- Musa Ilhan, wrestler
- Ersin Kaya, football player
- Birkan Kirdar, football player
- Gülcan Koca, football player
- Selin Kuralay, football player
- Funda Nakkaşoğlu, basketball player
- Kayhan Ozcicek-Takagi, judoka
- Levent Osman, football player (Turkish Cypriot origin)
- Tolgay Özbey, football player
- Susie Ramadan, boxer
- Aiden Sezer, rugby player (Turkish father)
- Sedat Sir, Australian rules football player
- Tarık Solak, kickboxing promoter
- Yaren Sözer, football player
- Ufuk Talay, football player
- Ramazan Tavşancıoğlu, football player
- Mehmet Yağcı, weightlifter
- Servet Uzunlar, football player

== Others ==
- Hakan Ayik, drug trafficker

== See also ==
- Turkish Australians
- List of Australians
