= Piotr Paweł Morta =

Piotr Morta
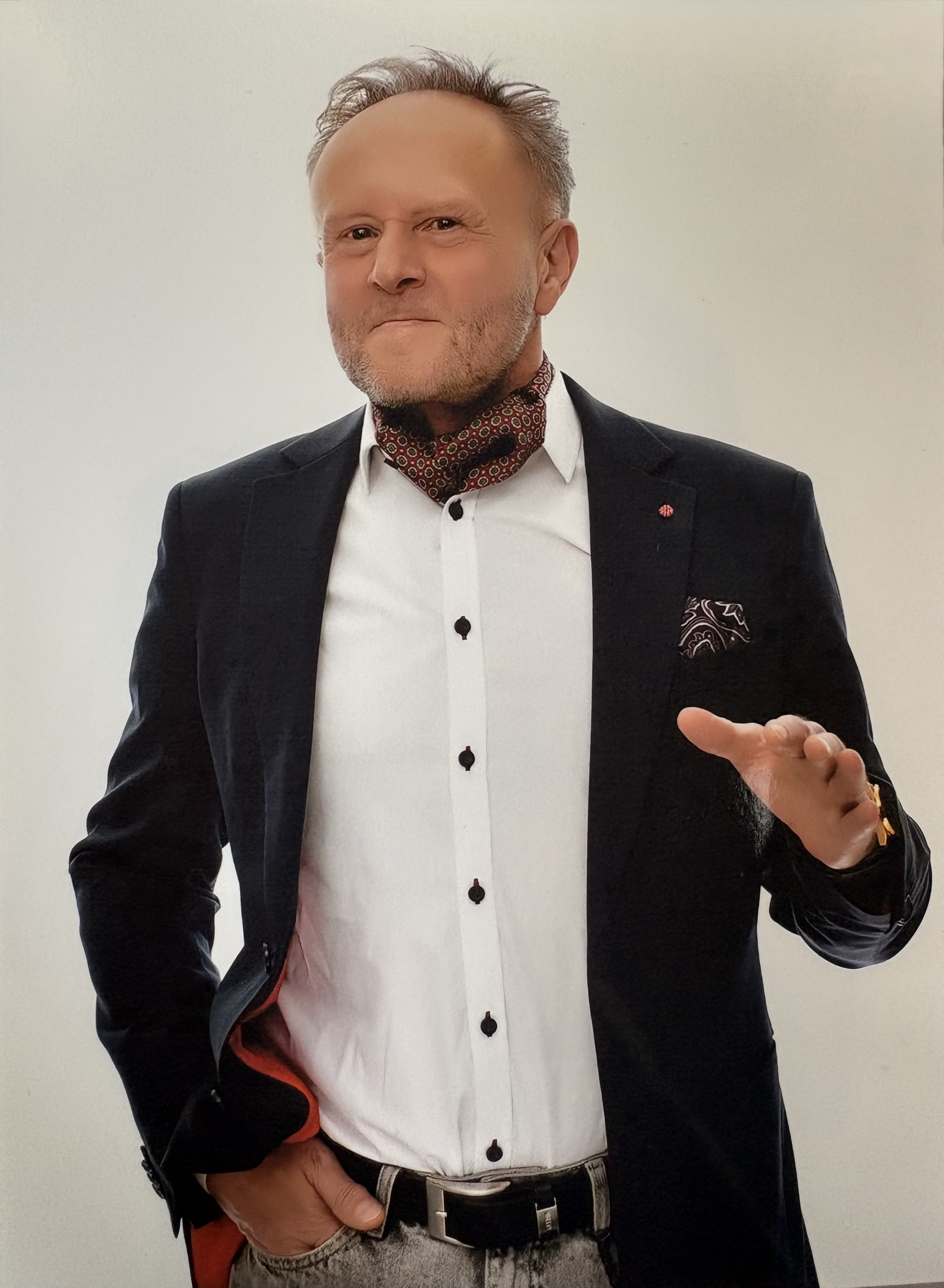

Chairman of the National Secretariat of Construction and Wood Workers of Independent Self-governing Labour Union "Solidarity"
- In office 1998–2014

Councillor of Wieruszów County (I, II, III, IV term of office)
- In office 1998–2014

Chairman of the National Secretariat of Construction, Wood Workers and Environmental Protection of Independent Self-governing Labour Union "Solidarity"-80
- Incumbent
- Assumed office 2014

Personal details
- Born: 19 June 1959 (age 67) Wieluń, Poland
- Spouse: Maria Jolanta Morta
- Children: Natalia Morta, Martyna Morta, Julia Morta
- Parent(s): Zofia Morta (née Płotek) and Wacław Morta
- Education: Poznań University of Economics and Business
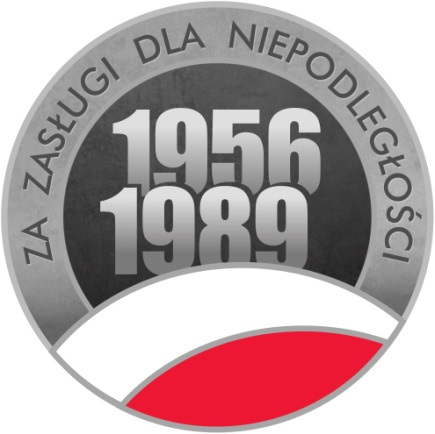
- Awards

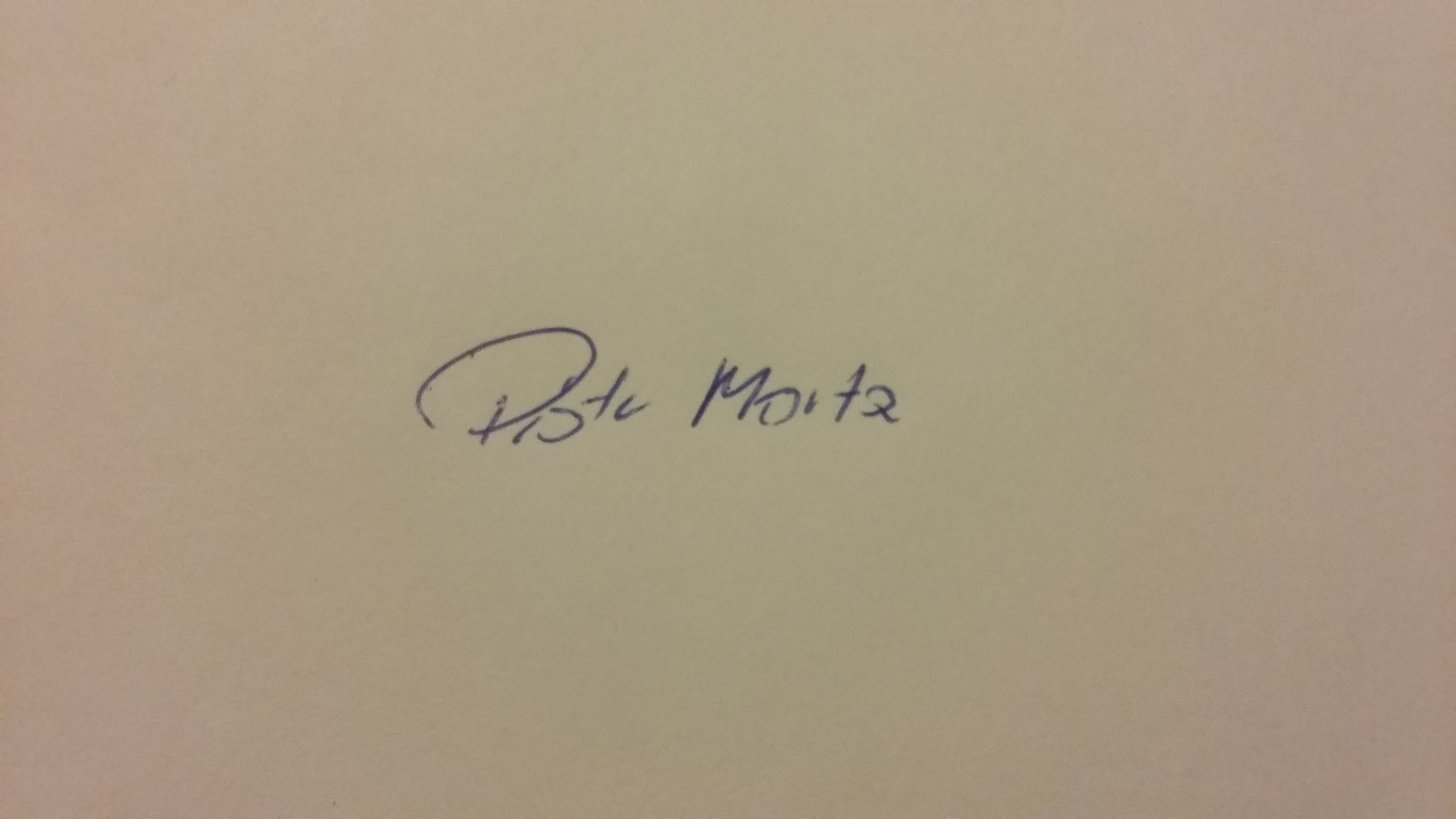
- Signature

Piotr Paweł Morta (born 19 June 1959 in Wieluń) is a Polish political activist, dissident, economist, co-inventor, activist in underground "Solidarity", Krajowy Mistrz Racjonalizacji 1983 (Polish master of rationalization in 1983), and vice-chairman of European Works Council Pfleiderer AG.

== Life ==
=== Education ===
He is an alumnus of the Poznań University of Economics and Business (then: Academy of Economics in Poznań). He studied management and marketing there.

=== Political career ===
In 1989 he created the Solidarity Citizens' Committee in Wieruszów. He was a member of City Council Board of Managers in years 1990-1994. He was also councillor of Gmina Wieruszów at the same time. Councillor of Wieruszów County over the period 1998-2002, 2002-2006, 2006–2010 and 2010-2014.

=== Other activities ===
In years 1998-2014 he was a chairman of the National Secretariat of Construction and Wood Workers of Independent Self-governing Labour Union "Solidarity". He has served as a chairman of the National Secretariat of Construction, Wood Workers and Environmental Protection of Independent Self-governing Labour Union "Solidarity"-80 since 2014. As a result of his efforts,"Solidarity"-80 became a member of the European Federation of Building and Woodworkers (EFBWW) on 1 July 2018. Moreover, he was vice-chairman of European Works Council Pfleiderer AG from 2007 to 2014. Since March 28, 2017, he has been a member of The Council for the Protection of Struggle and Martyrdom Sites at the Wrocław branch of the Institute of National Remembrance.

EFBWW Kraków, April 23, 2026 - Piotr Morta welcomes guests from across Europe

== Publications ==
Co-author of the publication "Szanse i zagrożenia rozwoju Zakładów Płyt Wiórowych Prospan S.A. będące wynikiem prywatyzacji" (Opportunities and threats to the Development of Particleboard Manufacturing Plant Prospan S.A. resulting from privatization), which was published by Poznań University of Economics and Business, Poznań 1997.

== Honours ==
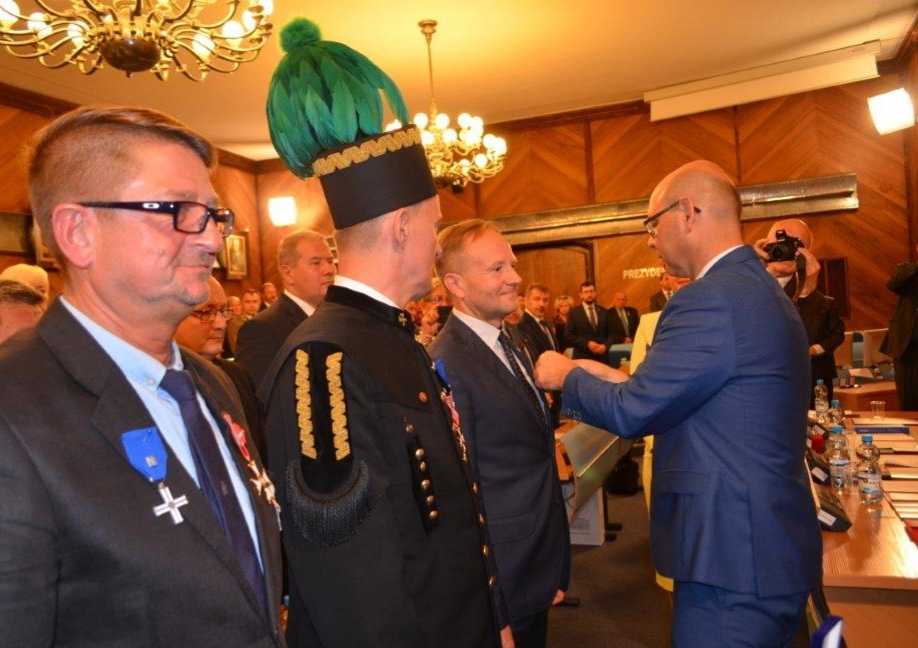
Piotr Morta receiving Krzyż Niezłomni Niepokorni 1956-1989

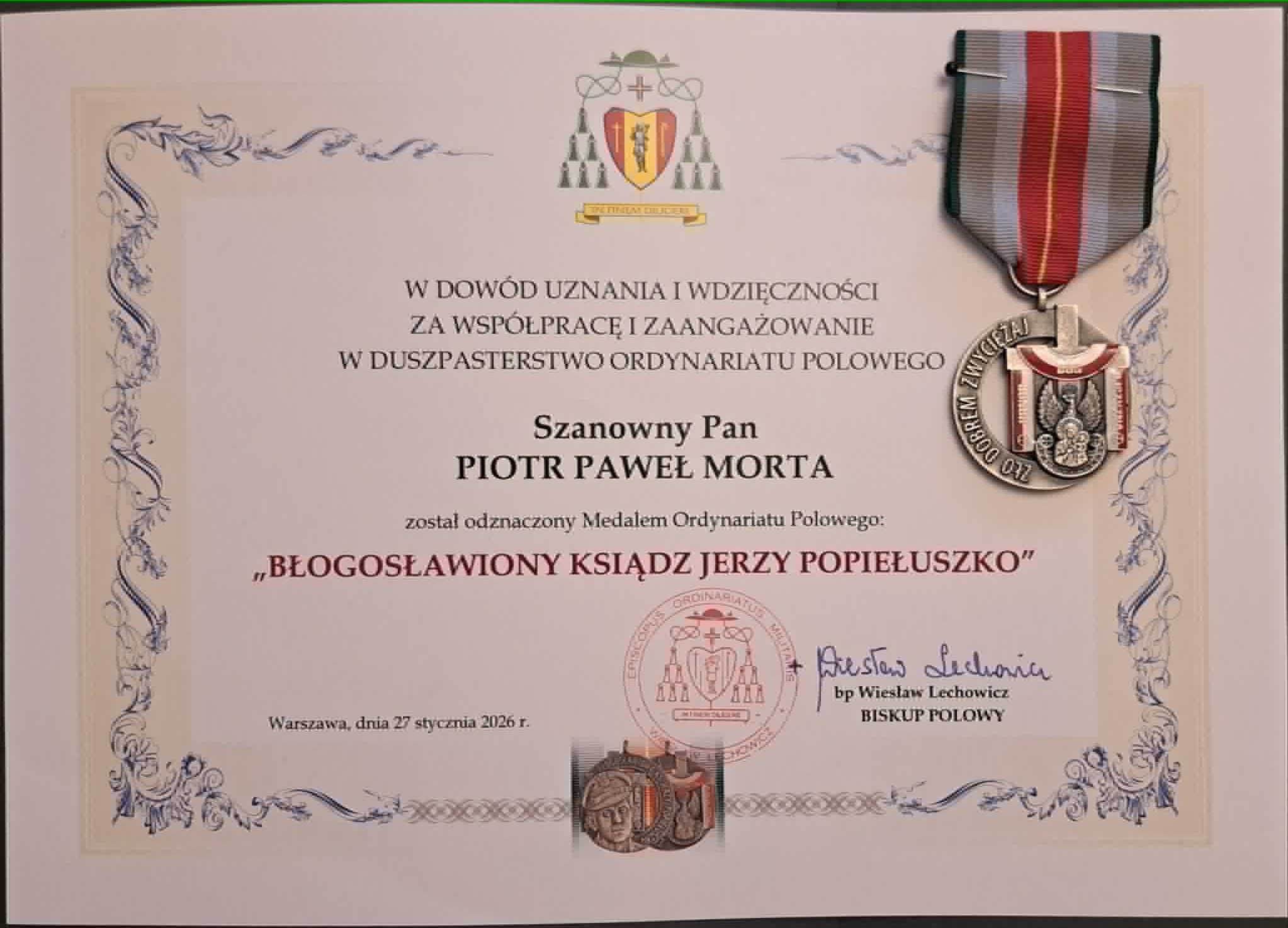
Medal of Blessed Father Jerzy Popiełuszko awarded to Piotr Morta

- 1998: Bronze Cross of Merit
- 2010: Silver Cross of Merit
- 2014: Cross of Freedom and Solidarity
- 2016: Odznaka honorowa "Działacza opozycji antykomunistycznej lub osoby represjonowanej z powodów politycznych" (Decoration of Honor for activist of anti-communist opposition or repressed person for political reasons)
- 2016: Krzyż Niezłomni Niepokorni 1956-1989 (Cross for unbreakable and disobedient person)
- 2016: Pro Patria Medal
- 2017: Primus in Agendo
- 2017: Złoty Kordelas Leśnika Polskiego (Gold cutlass of Polish forester)
- 2018: Order of Polonia Restituta (English: Order of the Rebirth of Poland)
- 2020: Medal of the Centenary of Regained Independence
- 2021: Medal "Pro Bono Poloniae"
- 2026: Medal of Blessed Father Jerzy Popiełuszko

Piotr Morta is a co-inventor of chain link - this invention was patented by the Polish Patent Office. He received a certificate from the Institute of National Remembrance - Commission for the Prosecution of Crimes against the Polish Nation. According to the certificate he is a victim in the meaning of the Act on the Institute of National Remembrance. In 2017 he was awarded the title of "Meritorious for Wieruszów County". On September 21, 2022, during the Solidarity-80 Delegates' Convention, he was awarded the Medal of Merit for Community Accords for his outstanding contributions to the democratic transition in Poland. On February 14, 2026, on the National Day of Remembrance of the Home Army Soldiers, he was awarded the Medal of Blessed Father Jerzy Popiełuszko in the Silesian Parliament Hall.

== Personal life ==
Piotr Morta is married to Maria Jolanta, who is a teacher. Together they have three daughters.

== Bibliography ==
- Encyclopedia of Solidarity
- Recipients of Cross of Freedom and Solidarity - Biography
- Grażyna Schlender (2001). Solidarność Wielkopolski Południowej w latach 1980–2000. Kalisz: Zarząd Regionu NSZZ "Solidarność" Wielkopolska Południowa. pp. 554, 555, 557, 560, 561, 562, 563. ISBN 83-911157-7-1.
