= Graeme Turner =

Australian academic (1947–2025)

Graeme Turner AO FAHA (1947 – 25 November 2025) was an Australian professor of cultural studies and an Emeritus Professor at the University of Queensland. During his institutional academic career, he was a Federation Fellow, a president of the Australian Academy of the Humanities, a founding director of the Centre for Critical and Cultural Studies at the University of Queensland, and convenor of the Australian Research Council Cultural Research Network. Turner was appointed an Officer of the Order of Australia (AO) in the 2019 Queen's Birthday Honours for services to education.

== Biography ==
Turner gained a master's degree from Queen's University, Canada, and his doctorate from the University of East Anglia, in the UK. Turner taught at the Queensland Institute of Technology (now Queensland University of Technology), the West Australian Institute of Technology (now part of Curtin University), and was Professor of Cultural Studies in the English Department at the University of Queensland before becoming the founding Director of the Centre for Critical and Cultural Studies in 1999. He was elected a Fellow of the Australian Academy of the Humanities in 1997 and was elected president in 2004. From 2001 until 2004, he was a member of the Expert Advisory Panel for Creative Arts and Humanities of the Australian Research Council (ARC).

In 2004, Turner was successful in his application for the ARC Cultural Research Network, one of only 24 Research Networks funded by the ARC, while in 2006 he was awarded a Federation Fellowship by the ARC to study "Television in the post-broadcast era: The role of old and new media in the formation of national communities".

In his speech to the National Press Club (Australia) on 3 September 2008, the Minister for Innovation, Industry, Science and Research, Senator the Hon. Kim Carr announced that Professor Turner had been appointed to the Prime Minister's Science, Engineering and Innovation Council (PMSEIC). This made Turner the only Humanities scholar on the Council, and only the second since the Council's inception (as the Prime Minister's Science Council) in 1989.

Turner was one of the key figures in the development of cultural and media studies in Australia. His work is used in many disciplines: cultural and media studies, communications, history, literary studies, and film and television studies. His over-arching research interests included Australian film and media, issues in Australian nationalism, popular culture, celebrity, talkback radio, audience studies, and the role of television in a post-broadcast era increasingly dominated by new media formats such as the Internet. His later research focuses on the transformation of "cultural fields".

In 2015, the journal Cultural Studies published a special issue "commemorating and evaluating the contribution of Graeme Turner to the field". Edited by Gerard Goggin, Anna Pertierra and Mark Andrejevic, this issue included contributions by Meaghan Morris, Toby Miller, Frances Bonner, Tony Bennett, John Byron, and Melissa Gregg.

Turner was appointed an Officer of the Order of Australia (AO) in the 2019 Queen's Birthday Honours for "distinguished service to higher education through pioneering work in the field of cultural studies and the humanities". Turner died on 25 November 2025.

== Selected bibliography ==
- Broken: Universities, Politics and the Public Good. Monash University Publishing, 2025.
- The Shrinking Nation. Queensland University Press, 2023.
- John Farnham's Whispering Jack. Bloomsbury, 2022.
- Australian Television: Programs, pleasures and politics. Routledge, 2021.
- Making Culture: Commercialisation, Transnationalism, and the State of 'Nationing' in Contemporary Australia. Eds. D. Rowe, G. Turner & E. Waterton. Routledge.
- Mapping the Humanities, Arts and Social Sciences in Australia (with Kylie Brass), Australian Academy of the Humanities, 2014.
- Locating Television: Zones of Consumption (with Anna Cristina Pertierra), Routledge, 2013.
- What’s Become of Cultural Studies?, Sage, 2012.
- Ordinary people and the media: The demotic turn, Theory, Culture and Society series, Sage, 2010.
- Television Studies After TV: Understanding television in the post-broadcast era, Routledge, 2009 (co-edited with Jinna Tay).
- The Media and Communications in Australia, third edition, Allen & Unwin, 2010 (with Stuart Cunningham). Previous editions 2002, 2006.
- Film as Social Practice, fourth edition, Routledge, 2006 ISBN 978-0-415-37514-6
- Ending the Affair: The decline of television current affairs in Australia, UNSW Press, 2005 ISBN 978-0-86840-864-4
- Understanding Celebrity, Sage, 2004 ISBN 978-0-7619-4168-2
- The Film Cultures Reader, Routledge, 2002 ISBN 978-0-415-25282-9
- British Cultural Studies: An Introduction, third edition, Routledge 2002 ISBN 978-0-415-25228-7
- Fame games: The production of Celebrity in Australia, Cambridge, 2000 (with Frances Bonner and P. David Marshall). ISBN 978-0-521-79486-2
- National Fictions: Literature, Film, and the Construction of Australian Narrative, Allen and Unwin, 1986 ISBN 978-0-04-800088-0
