= Poznań University of Economics and Business =

Business school in Poznań, Poland

Coordinates: 52°24′22″N 16°55′6″E

- Uniwersytet Ekonomiczny w Poznaniu
- Latin: Universitas Oeconomicae Posnaniensis
- Type: Public
- Established: 1926
- Rector: Professor Barbara Jankowska
- Faculty: 722 (2008)
- Administrative staff: 1141 (2008)
- Students: 7,420 (12.2023)
- Location: al. Niepodległości 10 60-967 Poznań, Greater Poland Voivodeship, Poland
- Website: www.ue.poznan.pl

The Poznań University of Economics and Business is a business school in Poland.

The Poznań University of Economics and Business (PUEB) is an academic institution in the western part of the country attracting students from many parts of Poland. It is the biggest and oldest business university in the region of Wielkopolska.

The main campus of the university is located in Poznań, but the university offers its courses also in seven other locations (colleges of higher education) situated within a distance of 30–100 km from Poznań (Bydgoszcz, Kalisz, Konin, Piła, Leszno, Zielona Góra, Szamotuły).

== History ==
The university's origin goes back to 1926, when the Foundation of the Chamber of Commerce and Industry founded the College of Commerce. As a private school, it had no authority to grant degrees. The school was given the authority in 1938 and, in the same year, was named the Academy of Commerce.

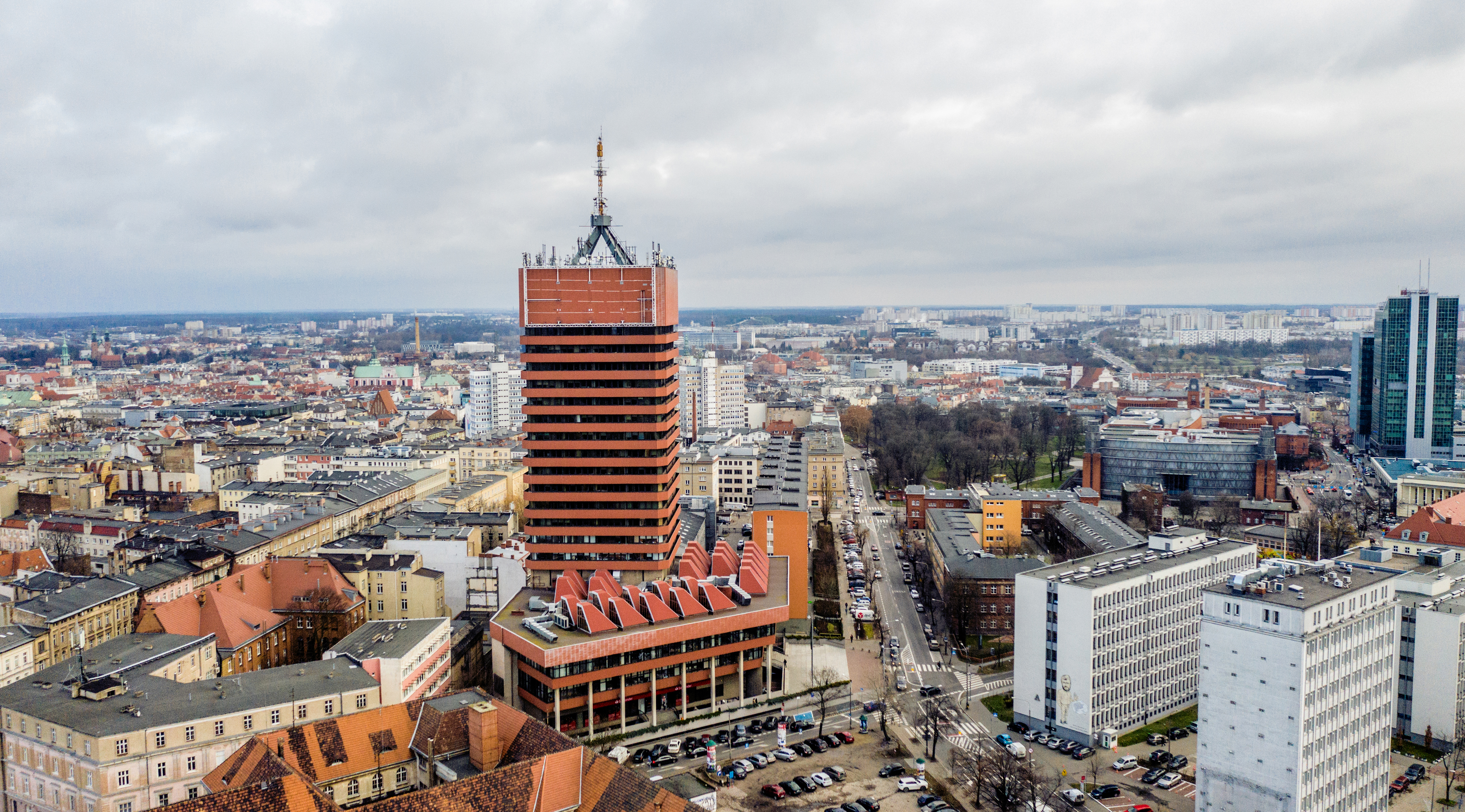
Collegium Altum

In 1950, there were 2026 students attending the Academy. In that year, the academy was taken over by the state and renamed the Higher School of Economics, initially with two faculties, then three. In 1954, the university ran uniform five-year courses leading to a master's degree.

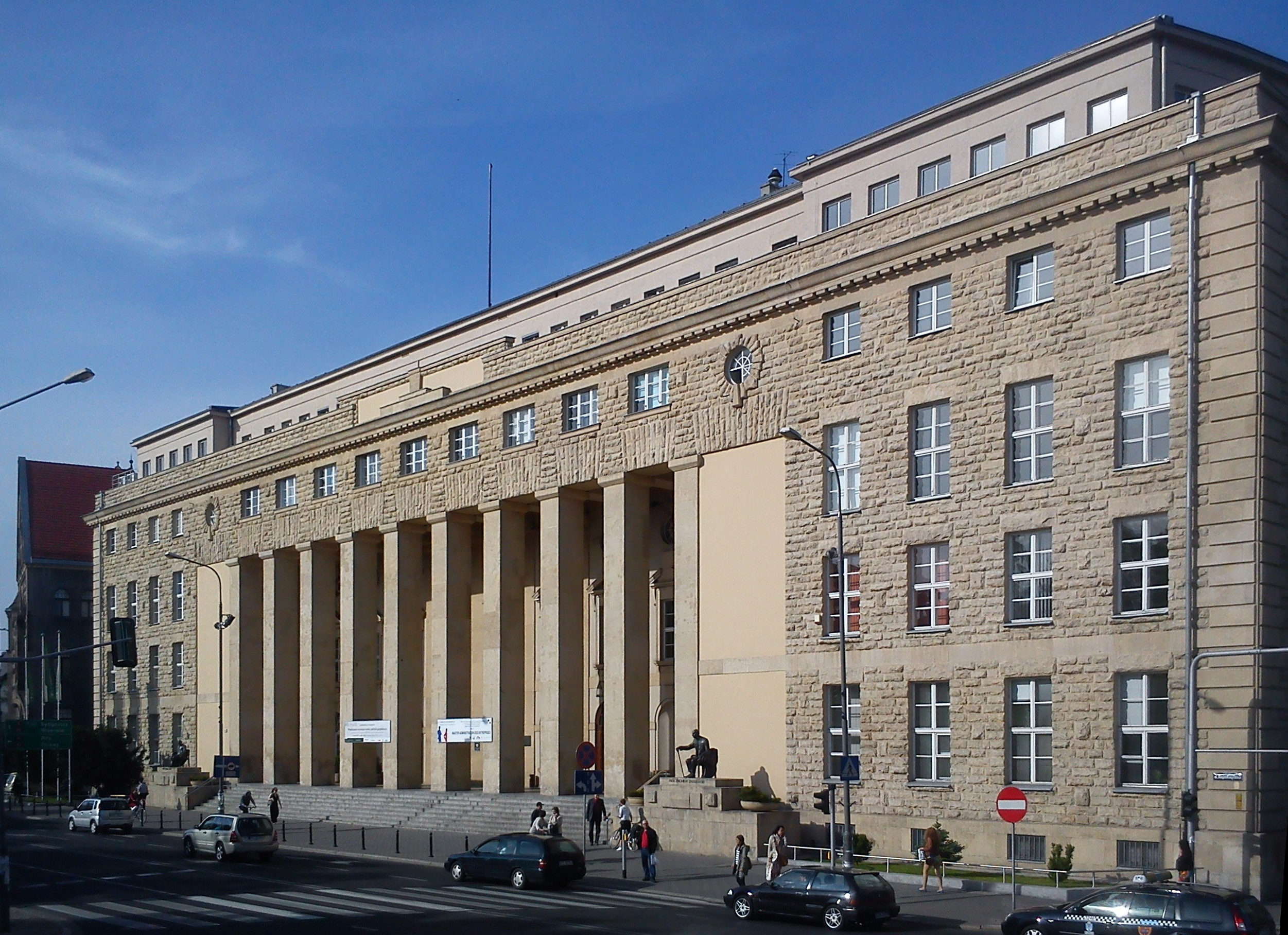
10 Niepodległości Avenue in Poznań

In 1974, the school was named the Academy of Economics and was granted the authority to award the degrees of doctor and habilitated doctor (both of economic sciences).

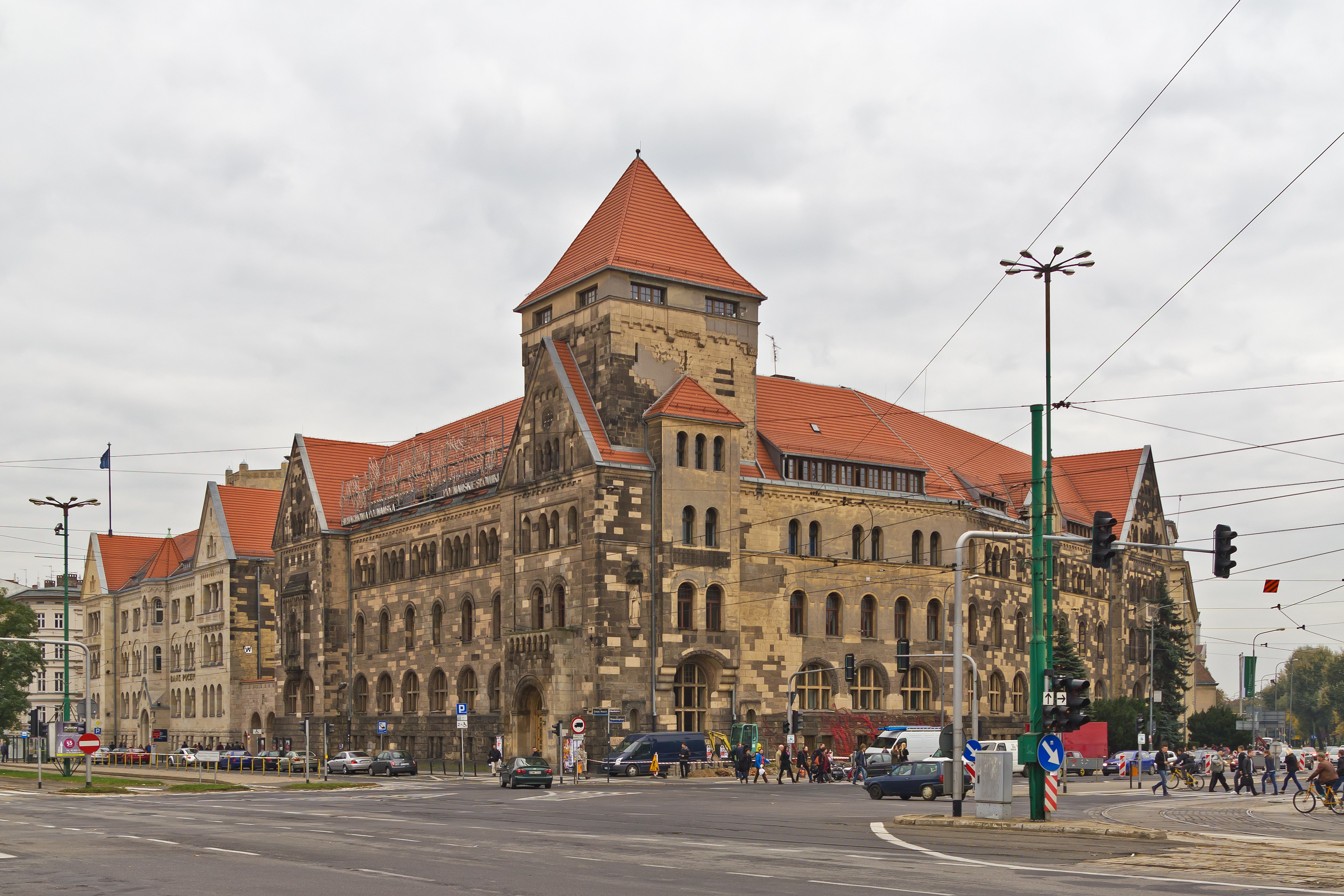
12 Niepodległości Avenue in Poznań

In 1990, the Poznań Academy of Economics fundamentally restructured its faculties, courses, specialisations and curricula. While the years 1998–2000 witnessed a further growth in the number of students. Changes in syllabuses make it possible to aim at European educational standards in all major fields of training and specialisation.

On December 27, 2008, the school was formally granted the status of a university and given its current name – University of Economics in Poznań. Starting 1 October 2015 our University changed its name into Poznań University of Economics and Business.

== Offers ==
Presently, PUEB specialises in educating economists, managers and specialists in quality management in all sectors of the economy. It offers all academic degrees: Master of Arts, Master of Science, Doctorate and Habilitation (mgr, dr, dr hab.) in three study modes (day, evening and extramural). The university expands its post-master programmes in order to meet the growing demand from those who are already professionally active. During the academic year 2000/2001, the university introduced the European Credit Transfer System (ECTS) at the Faculty of Management, the Faculty of Economics and the Faculty of Commodity Science.

== Students ==
In the academic year 2014/2015, 10,159 students have enrolled, although, in the academic year 2010/2011, there were altogether app. 15,000 students enrolled.

== International students ==
For international students, the university has developed courses in English, French, German and Russian as well as Polish language course for beginners. The courses in foreign languages are also available for Polish students, who are thus given an opportunity to develop their language skills and prepare for studies abroad.

== Research ==
The main subjects of research range from various aspects of Poland's economic transformation to the preparation of Polish enterprises for competition within the European Union and the globalization trends in the world economy. Product and organisational innovations are those subjects of research which the Poznań University of Economics intends to develop further in close co-operation with Polish enterprises. PUE also focuses on international market research (primarily the EU, but also Central and East European countries) in order to facilitate the expansion of Poland's export trade.

== University ranking ==
In terms of enrolment as well as scientific and academic potential, the Poznań University of Economics ranks among the leading economic universities in Poland. Since 2000, the university has become second in rankings published by such Polish magazines as Polityka, Rzeczpospolita, Perspektywy, Magazyn Businessman and Newsweek Polska.

== Notable graduates ==
- Marek Kowalkiewicz (born 1978), Polish-Australian computer scientist
- Jan Kulczyk (1950–2015), billionaire businessman, the founder and owner of Kulczyk Holding (headquartered in Warsaw) and an international investment house Kulczyk Investments (former name: Kulczyk Investment House) with headquarters in Luxembourg and offices in London and Kyiv.
- Omenaa Mensah (born 1979), TV presenter, entrepreneur, investor, philanthropist and art collector
- Piotr Paweł Morta (born 1959), political activist, dissident, economist, co-inventor, activist in underground "Solidarity", Krajowy Mistrz Racjonalizacji 1983 (Polish master of rationalization in 1983), and vice-chairman of European Works Council Pfleiderer AG.
- Killion Munyama (born 1961), a Zambian-born Polish economist, academic lecturer, politician and a delegate to the Polish parliament (the 7th and 8th Sejm) since 2011.
- Karolina Pawliczak (born 1976), lawyer and politician
- Agata Sobczyk (born 1988), Polish economist and politician, voivode of the Greater Poland Voivodeship since 2023
