= ARC Centre of Excellence for Creative Industries and Innovation =

Defunct Australian research centre

Coordinates: 27.45502°S 153.01348°E

The ARC Centre of Excellence for Creative Industries and Innovation (CCI) was an Australian research centre that undertook research in media studies, cultural studies, communication studies, law, education, economics, business technology, and information technology, related to the creative economy, between 2005 and 2013.

== History ==
The Centre was formally established in 2005 with core funding from the Australian Research Council (ARC), the Australian Government's main agency for allocating research funding to academics and researchers in Australian universities, for the period 2005 to 2010. At this time, a series of government-commissioned reports on Australia's innovation system had recently argued for a national commitment to creative innovation. ARC funding was extended, following an ARC review in 2008, for the period 2010 to 2013.

== Description ==
CCI was the first ARC centre of excellence in the humanities and creative arts. The Centre was based in Brisbane, Australia, at the Kelvin Grove Campus of the Queensland University of Technology.

The Directorate and largest research node of CCI were located at Queensland University of Technology. The second largest research node was at Swinburne University of Technology. Smaller research nodes were located at other research partner institutions: RMIT University, Deakin University, University of New South Wales, Edith Cowan University, Curtin University and Australian Film Television and Radio School.

== Notable staff ==
Staff included:

- Stuart Cunningham, Director
- Jean Burgess, Deputy Director
- Brian Fitzgerald
- John Hartley
- Lelia Green
