= International Journal of Cultural Studies =

- Discipline: Cultural studies
- Language: English
- Edited by: Jonathan Gray, Jean Burgess, Anthony Fung, Paul Frosh, Myria Georgiou, Lori Kido Lopez

Publication details
- History: 1998-present
- Publisher: SAGE Publications
- Frequency: Bimonthly
- Impact factor: 1.862 (2020)

Standard abbreviations
- ISO 4: Int. J. Cult. Stud.

Indexing
- ISSN: 1367-8779 (print); 1460-356X (web)
- OCLC no.: 42449276

Links
- Journal homepage; Online access; Online archive

The International Journal of Cultural Studies is a peer-reviewed academic journal covering cultural studies. The first editor-in-chief was John Hartley (Curtin and Cardiff universities). The journal was established in 1998 and is published six times per year by SAGE Publications. The journal is currently run by chief editor Jonathan Gray (University of Wisconsin-Madison, USA) along with co-editors: Jean Burgess (Queensland University of Technology, Australia); Anthony Fung (The Chinese University of Hong Kong); Paul Frosh (Hebrew University of Jerusalem); Myria Georgiou (London School of Economics and Political Science, UK) and Lori Kido Lopez (University of Wisconsin-Madison, USA).

== Abstracting and indexing ==
The journal is abstracted and indexed in:

- Academic Premier
- Applied Social Sciences Index & Abstracts
- Arts & Humanities Citation Index
- Current Contents/Arts & Humanities
- Current Contents/Social & Behavioral Sciences
- Educational Research Abstracts
- Social Sciences Citation Index
- Scopus

According to the Journal Citation Reports, the journal has a 2020 impact factor of 1.862 placing it at position 7/45 in the Web of Science category Cultural Studies.
