= Stuart Cunningham =

Australian academic

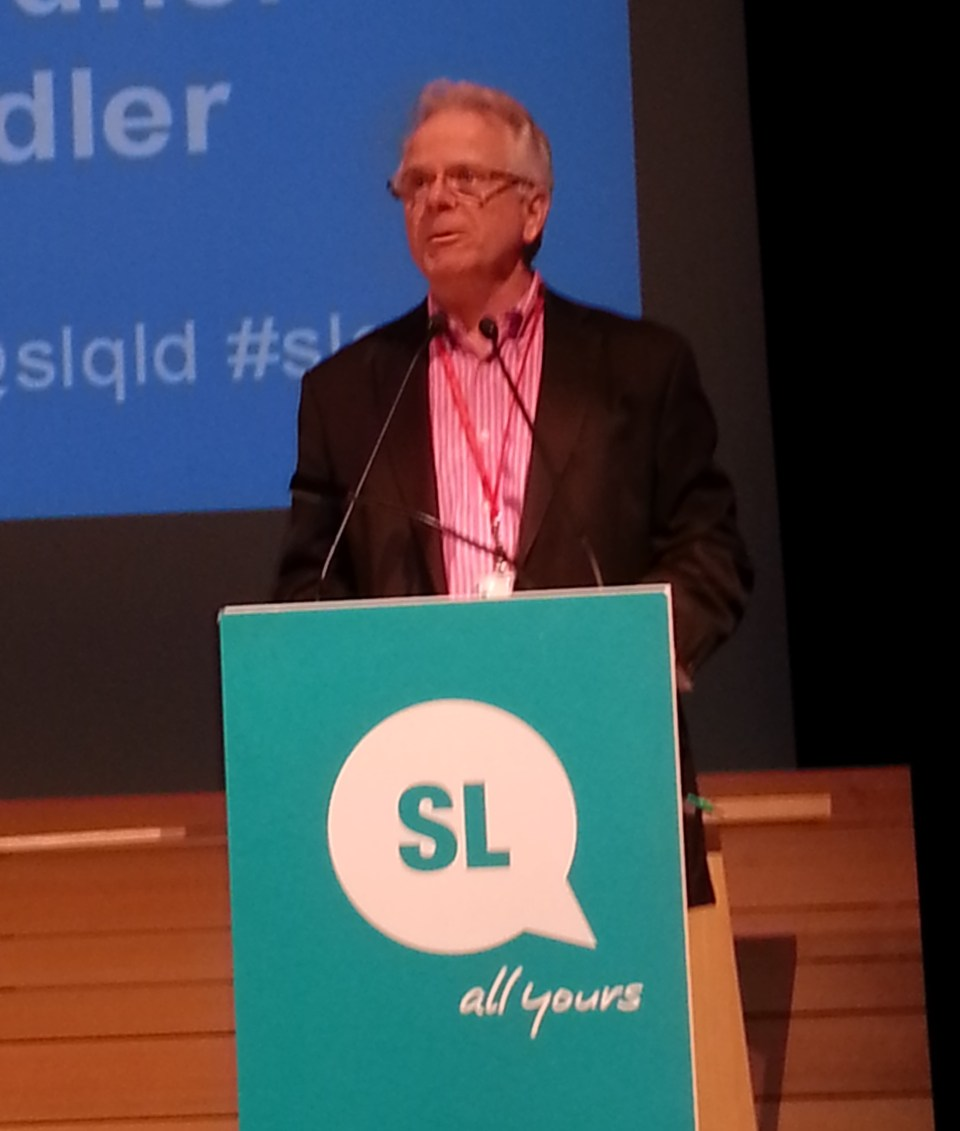
Stuart Cunningham delivers a speech at the State Library of Queensland.

Stuart Cunningham AM FAHA (born 1953) is Distinguished Emeritus Professor of Communication and Media Studies at QUT.

== Biography ==
He is a Distinguished Emeritus Professor of Communication and Media Studies, Queensland University of Technology, and Former Director of the Australian Research Council ARC Centre of Excellence for Creative Industries and Innovation. He was President of the Council of Humanities, Arts and Social Sciences (CHASS) in Australia from September 2006 to October 2008.

With degrees from the University of Queensland, and McGill University in Canada, Cunningham was awarded his Doctorate from Griffith University in Brisbane in 1988. He is well known for his contributions to media, communications and cultural studies and to their relevance to industry practice and government policy. A key figure in cultural policy studies and creative industries, he has written a number of influential books, including The Media and Communications in Australia (co-edited with Graeme Turner) which has gone into four editions and is the standard text in the field in Australia.

He is an appointed member of the Australian Research Council's College of Experts 2005-7, Adjunct Professor of the Australian National University 2006-8 and Node Convenor, Cultural Technologies, for the ARC Cultural Research Network (CRN).

He has co-authored several major reports for bodies such as UNCTAD, the federal departments of education and communications, the Australian Broadcasting Authority, Queensland state government and Brisbane City Council. He was a board member of the Australian Film Commission 1992-98, and was recently concluded a period as foundation chair of QPIX, Queensland's Screen Development Centre for eight years, 1997-2005. He was Treasurer and Council and Executive member of the Australian Academy of the Humanities from 2003-6, having been elected to that Academy as one its inaugural fellows in cultural and communication studies in 1997. He was an elected board member of the Council of Humanities, Arts and Social Sciences (CHASS) in 2005-6.

He was selected as one of a thousand notable Australians for the Australia 2020 Summit in Canberra in April 2008.

== Honours and recognition ==
Cunningham was elected a Fellow of the Australian Academy of the Humanities in 1997. He was awarded a Centenary Medal in 2003 in recognition of his contribution to the humanities in Australia. In the 2015 Queen's Birthday Honours he was appointed a Member of the Order of Australia for "significant service to higher education".

== Select bibliography ==
- What Price a Creative Economy? Platform Paper series, Currency House, July 2006
- The Media and Communications in Australia (edited with Graeme Turner), Allen & Unwin, 2006
- The Australian TV Book (edited with Graeme Turner), Allen & Unwin, 2000
- Floating lives: The media and Asian diasporas (edited with John Sinclair), University of Queensland Press, 2000
- The Media in Australia: Industries, Texts, Audiences, 2nd ed (edited with Graeme Turner), Allen & Unwin, 1997
- New Patterns in Global Television: Peripheral Vision (edited with John Sinclair and Liz Jacka), Oxford University Press, 1996
- Australian Television and International Mediascapes (with Liz Jacka), Cambridge University Press, 1996
- Contemporary Australian Television (with Toby Miller), University of New South Wales Press, 1994
