= Jean Burgess =

Australian academic

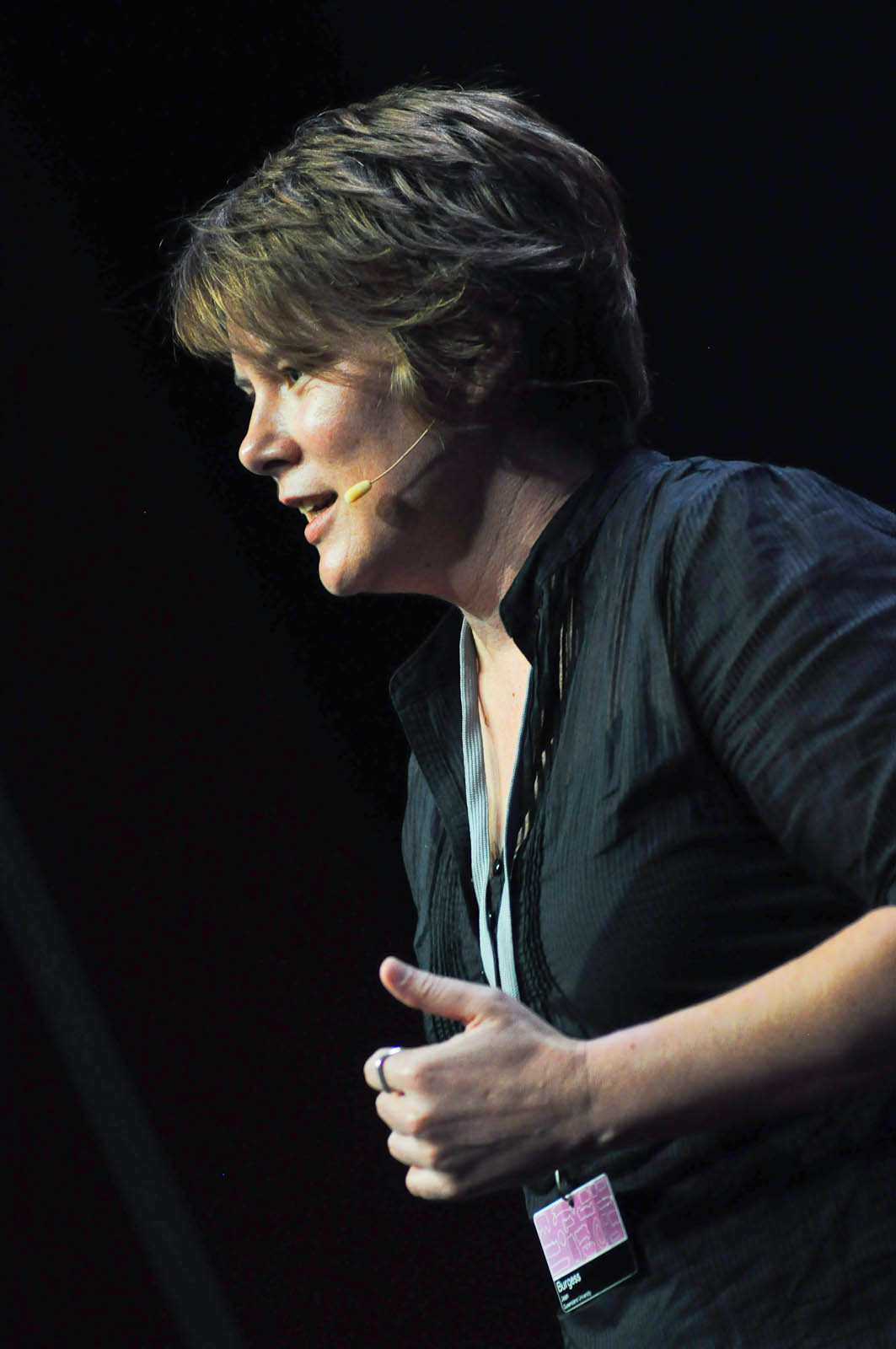
Jean Burgess, Lift Conference, Geneva 2010

Jean Burgess FAHA is a Distinguished Professor of Digital Media at the QUT Digital Media Research Centre, (which she founded and directed between 2015 and 2020) and in the QUT School of Communication. She is currently associate director of the ARC Centre of Excellence for Automated Decision-Making and Society. She was the deputy director of the former ARC Centre of Excellence for Creative Industries and Innovation (CCI) at the Queensland University of Technology. From 2010 to 2013 Jean was an Australian Research Council Postdoctoral Fellow (APD), working with Axel Bruns on the ARC Discovery Project 'New Media and Public Communication'. She researches and publishes on issues of cultural participation in new media contexts, with a particular focus on user-created content, online social networks, and co-creative media including digital storytelling.

She was elected a Fellow of the Australian Academy of the Humanities in 2021.

== Education ==
A classically trained musician with an honours degree in flute performance, Burgess completed a Master of Philosophy at the University of Queensland before undertaking a PhD at Queensland University of Technology. Her doctoral thesis, entitled Vernacular creativity and new media, focused on the ways in which everyday practices of symbolic creativity (including storytelling and amateur photography) both pre-date digital technologies and are remediated by them.

== Notable publications ==
In 2009, with Joshua Green, Burgess published the book YouTube: Online Video and Participatory Culture. The book examines the ways in which YouTube is being used by the media industries, by audiences and amateur producers, and by particular communities of interest, and explains how these uses challenge existing ideas about cultural ‘production’ and ‘consumption’. It includes specially commissioned chapters by John Hartley and Henry Jenkins.

The book was widely reviewed in academic journals including Media International Australia, Popular Communication and the International Journal of Digital Television. It has since been translated into Italian, Brazilian Portuguese, Polish and Korean.

With Andrew King, Burgess co-edited an edition of M/C Journal themed "Porn and the Mediasphere", and worked on the ARC-funded Understanding Pornography in Australia report.

== Media appearances ==
On his blog, Professor Henry Jenkins interviewed Burgess in October 2007 about her doctoral research.

Burgess was interviewed in January 2009 by The Enthusiast magazine about YouTube's difficulties balancing copyright issues with the creative activities of its users.

In 2010, Burgess was interviewed about her YouTube research by prime-time Channel Seven current affairs TV program Today Tonight.

In February 2011, Burgess spoke to Radio National's Background Briefing on how natural disasters are handled and mishandled by both broadcast and participatory media.
