= Medal of Blessed Father Jerzy Popiełuszko =

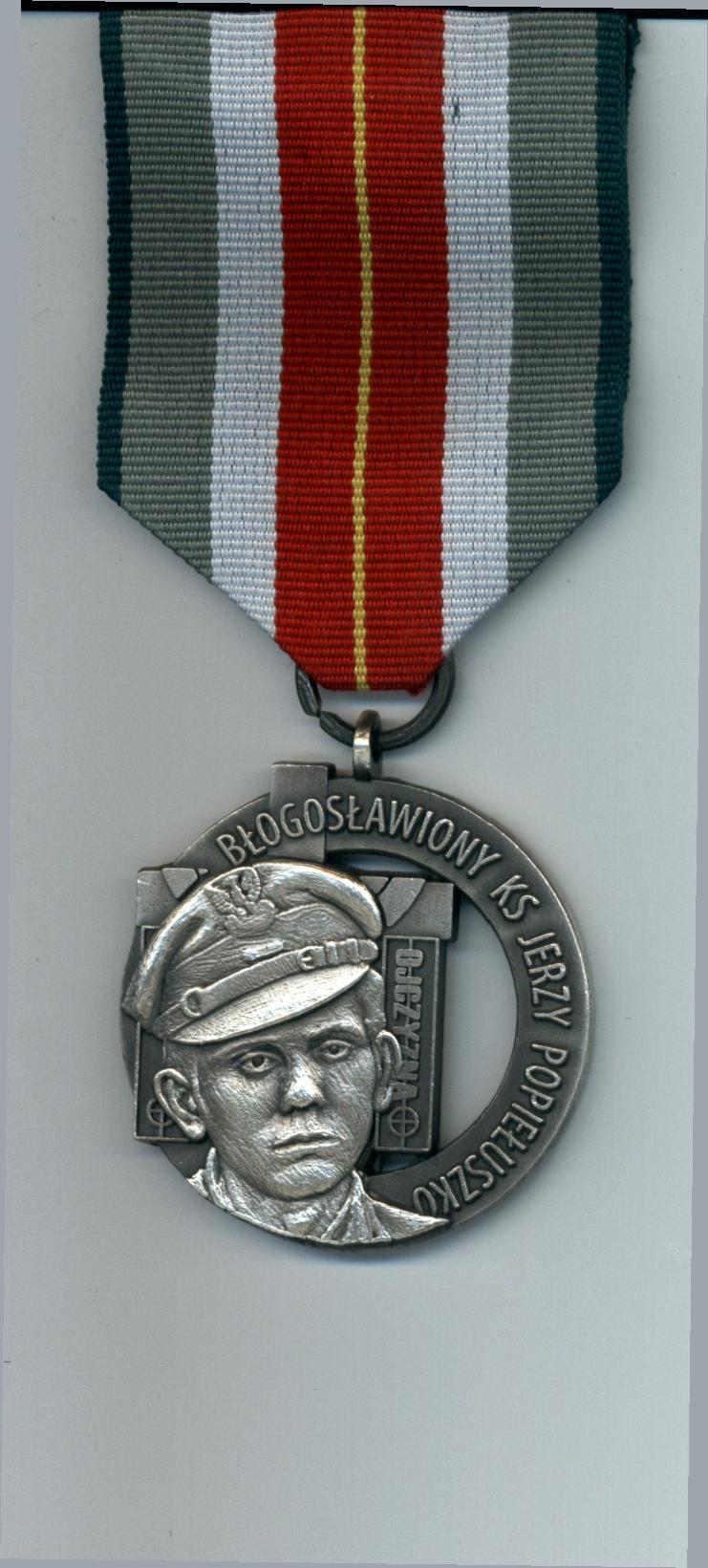

- Ribbon
- Established: 5 October 2011

Medal of Blessed Father Jerzy Popiełuszko is a medal established by the Field Bishop of the Polish Army by virtue of a decree dated 5 October 2011.

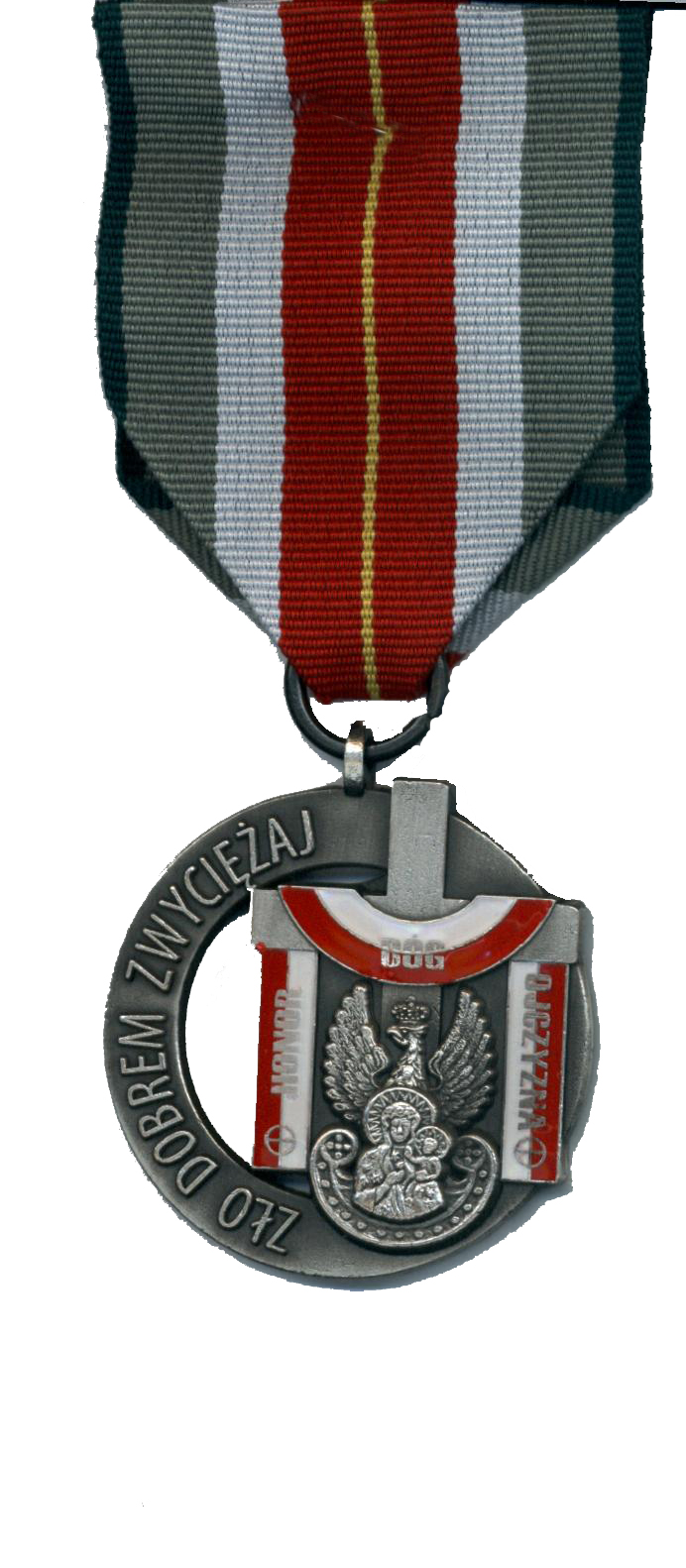
Back

== Broadcasting rules ==
The medal is awarded by the Field Bishop of the Polish Army to clergy and lay people who, “following the example of Father Jerzy, serve truth, love, and forgiveness.”.

== History ==
This medal was established, among other things (primarily), to honor alumni-soldiers who completed their basic military service in the so-called clerical units of the Polish People's Army. These units were officially called school field rescue battalions. They were also among the first group of recipients of the medal.

Since then, the medal has also been awarded to, among others: members of the strike committee of the sit-in strike at the Higher Officer School of Firefighting in 1981, Bishop Jan Tyrawa, Wojciech Noszczyk, Jerzy Kalina, General Tadeusz Bieńkowicz, pseudonym “Rączy”, and Piotr Morta.

== Description of the medal ==
The medal depicts Blessed Jerzy Popiełuszko, during his basic military service as a cadet-soldier in the 54th Field Rescue Battalion in Bartoszyce.

The obverse of the round medal, with a diameter of 40 mm, features an image of Father Jerzy Popiełuszko in military uniform. On the reverse side logo of the Polish Army Field Ordinariate, there is a cross, a stole with the inscription “God-Honor-Fatherland,” an image of Black Madonna of Częstochowa and the slogan: “Overcome evil with good.”

The medal is suspended from a 45 mm wide ribbon with six stripes in khaki, white, and red, with dark green 2 mm stripes along the sides.
