= John Hartley (academic) =

Anglo-Australian academic (born 1948)

- Born: 1948 (age 77–78); London, England
- Awards: John Curtin Distinguished Professor

Academic background
- Education: University of Wales

Academic work
- Main interests: Cultural science, media studies
- Notable works: Reading Television
- Hartley's voice recorded September 2018

John Hartley (born 1948), AM, FAHA, FRSA, FLSW, ICA Fellow, is an Australian academic and a John Curtin Distinguished Emeritus Professor. He was formerly Professor of Cultural Science and the Director of the Centre for Culture and Technology (CCAT) at Curtin University in Western Australia, and Professor of Journalism, Media and Cultural Studies at Cardiff University. He has published over twenty books about communication, journalism, media and cultural studies, many of which have been translated into other languages. Hartley is an adjunct professor with CCAT.

== Early life ==
Hartley was born in London. He attended Sir Roger Manwood's School, and completed a Bachelor of Arts (with Honours) in English Language and Literature at the University of Wales in 1975. He moved to Australia in 1985.

== Academic life ==
Hartley has worked in Wales and Australia (Western Australia and Queensland). He was at the Polytechnic of Wales from 1975 to 1984, initially as a research assistant and tutor, and then as a lecturer in communication and cultural studies. From 1985 to 1995 he held a number of positions at Murdoch University, ranging from lecturer to Director of the Centre for Research in Culture and Communication. In 1990 he received a PhD in communications from Murdoch University. He was a professor at Edith Cowan University from 1995 to 1998.

From 1996 to 2000 Hartley was the head of the newly created Cardiff School of Journalism, Media and Cultural Studies at Cardiff University, and Director of its Tom Hopkinson Centre for Media Research. In 2000 he received a Doctor of Letters from the University of Wales. In 1998 Hartley founded the International Journal of Cultural Studies, published by Sage Publications Ltd in London. He was elected a Fellow of the Australian Academy of the Humanities in 2001.

Hartley was Dean of the Creative Industries Faculty at Queensland University of Technology from 2000 to 2005. He was an Australian Research Council (ARC) Federation Fellow and Research Director at the ARC Centre of Excellence for Creative Industries and Innovation at Queensland University of Technology from 2005 to 2010. In 2006 he was made a Life Fellow of the Royal Society of Arts, having been a member since 1996.

In 2012 he became a Fellow of the International Communication Association. Between 2012 and 2019 Hartley was Professor of Cultural Science and Director of the Centre for Culture and Technology at Curtin University, and Professor of Journalism, Media and Cultural Studies at Cardiff University.

In December 2012 he was recognised for his academic contributions by being awarded the title of John Curtin Distinguished Professor. In 2014 the Queensland University of Technology announced the John Hartley Oxford Institute Summer Doctoral Programme Scholarship, to allow two students per year for the next five to six years to attend the Oxford Internet Institute's summer doctoral programme. The scholarship is funded in part by "a generous personal gift" from Hartley, matched by funds from the university.

In 2017, Hartley was elected a Fellow of the Learned Society of Wales. He led the Digital Culture & New Media research program at Curtin University's CCAT. He is also a member of CCAT's Indigenous Culture and Digital Technologies; New Models of Publishing; and Digital China Lab research programs. He continues, as of 2021, as an adjunct professor with the centre.

== Publications ==
Hartley has published over twenty books about communication, journalism, media and cultural studies, and over 200 papers. His works have been translated into over a dozen languages.

He published his first book, Reading Television, in 1978. The book co-authored with John Fiske, was the first to analyse television from a cultural perspective and is considered a defining publication in the field. It sold over 100,000 copies, in seven languages.

=== Bibliography ===
- Reading Television. Methuen. 1978. (with John Fiske)
- Understanding News. Methuen. 1982.
- Making Sense of the Media. Comedia. 1985. (with others)
- Tele-ology: Studies in Television. Routledge. 1992.
- The Politics of Pictures: The Creation of the Public in the Age of Popular Media. Routledge. 1993.
- Telling Both Stories: Aboriginal Australia and the Media. Arts Enterprise, Edith Cowan University. 1996. (with Alan McKee)
- Popular Reality: Journalism, Modernity, Popular Culture. Arnold. 1996.
- Uses of Television. Routledge. 1999.
- American Cultural Studies: A Reader. Oxford University Press. 2000. (with others)
- The Indigenous Public Sphere: The Reporting and Reception of Aboriginal Issues in the Australian Media. Oxford University Press. 2000. (with Alan McKee)
- Reading Television: 25th Anniversary Edition. Routledge. 2003. (with John Fiske)
- A Short History of Cultural Studies. Sage Publications. 2003.
- Creative Industries. Wiley-Blackwell. 2005.
- TV50. Australian Centre for the Moving Image. 2006.
- Television Truths: Forms of Knowledge in Popular Culture. Wiley-Blackwell. 2007.
- The Uses of Digital Literacy. University of Queensland Press. 2009.
- Story Circle: Digital Storytelling Around the World. Wiley-Blackwell. 2009. (with Kelly McWilliam)
- Communication, Cultural and Media Studies: The Key Concepts (4th ed.). Routledge. 2011 [1983].
- Digital Futures for Cultural and Media Studies. Wiley-Blackwell. 2012.
- Walter J Ong (2012). Orality and Literacy (30th Anniversary ed.). Routledge. (Foreword, afterword)
- Key Concepts in Creative Industries. Sage Publication. 2013. (with others)
- A Companion to New Media Dynamics. Wiley-Blackwell. 2013. (with others)
- Cultural Science: A Natural History of Stories, Demes, Knowledge and Innovation. Bloomsbury. 2014. (with Jason Potts)
- How We Use Stories and Why That Matters. Bloomsbury. 2020.

== Honours ==
In 2001 Hartley received the Centenary Medal for "service to Australian society and the humanities in cultural and communication studies".

Hartley was made a Member of the Order of Australia (AM) in 2009, for "service to education as an academic and commentator in the areas of journalism, culture and media studies".
