= Dale Nyholt =

Australian human geneticist

Dale R. Nyholt
- Born: 1971 (age 54–55); Geelong, Victoria, Australia
- Education: Griffith University
- Scientific career
- Fields: Human genetics; Statistical genetics
- Institutions: Queensland University of Technology
- Thesis: Migraine linkage and allelic association studies (1998)

Dale R. Nyholt (born 1971) is an Australian human geneticist who is a professor in the School of Biomedical Sciences at Queensland University of Technology, where he also serves as Director of Research in the School of Biomedical Sciences and head of the Statistical and Genomic Epidemiology Laboratory.

Born in Geelong, Victoria, Australia, Nyholt was educated at Griffith University, where he received his BSc degree in 1993 and his PhD in 1998.
