= Lelia Green =

Australian academic

Lelia Green is a professor at the School of Arts and Humanities at Edith Cowan University, Perth. Green is the author of Technoculture: From Alphabet to Cybersex and the editor of Framing Technology: Society, Choice and Change, and also on the editorial board of the Australia Journal of Communication and Media International Australia Incorporating Culture and Policy.

== Major areas of work ==
Lelia Green is the author of Technoculture: From Alphabet to Cybersex. She defines "technoculture" as the integration of new communication technologies into a society, and in her book she explores the effects of the digital age on society, its structure, and policy creation.

Green argues early in her book that the term "technoculture" is a word that should not be used lightly, as the concept itself is meant to refer closely and accurately to technologies that assist the communication through which culture is built. These technologies can refer to any means of communication in a concrete, physical form. Understood in this context, written language can be regarded as technocultural; however, spoken language cannot, though it can become technocultural if it is placed in a recorded or transmitted form.

=== Lelia Green and Technology Change ===
==== The mythology of technology ====
The myths surrounding scientific and technological advancements are based around a celebration of the importance of these developments in our lives. Green emphasizes that the success or failure of a new technological development is based largely on the social context in which it is developed. In order for an invention to be adopted into a society, it must first be accepted, then integrated into the daily experience of the individuals who make up that society. Green argues that technology is developed and adopted due to "social determinism".

==== The ABC of Technological Advantage ====
Green argues that technological advancements are the result of the choices and priorities of the powerful social elite, who she identifies as the "A, B and C of social power"—the armed forces, the bureaucracy, and the corporate sector. Green maintains that these powerful groups, rather than the whole of society, ensure that the technological developments are implemented and accepted. Green also notes that with globalization, the Western power elites are exporting new ideas and new technologies to other cultures and societies around the world, and these societies in turn affect the way the technology is used.

== Books ==
- Green, Lelia, 2010, The Internet: An Introduction to new media, Berg, New York. ISBN 978-1-84788-299-8
- Green, Lelia, 2002, Technoculture: From Alphabet to Cybersex, Allen & Unwin, Sydney. ISBN 1-86508-048-9
- Green, Lelia and Guinery, R. (Eds), 1994, Framing technology: Society, Choice and Change, Allen & Unwin, Sydney. ISBN 1-86373-525-9
