= List of people legally executed in South Australia =

This is a list of people executed in South Australia. It lists people who were executed by British (and from 1901, Australian) authorities within the modern-day boundaries of South Australia. For people executed in other parts of Australia, see the sidebar.

== 1830s to 1850s ==
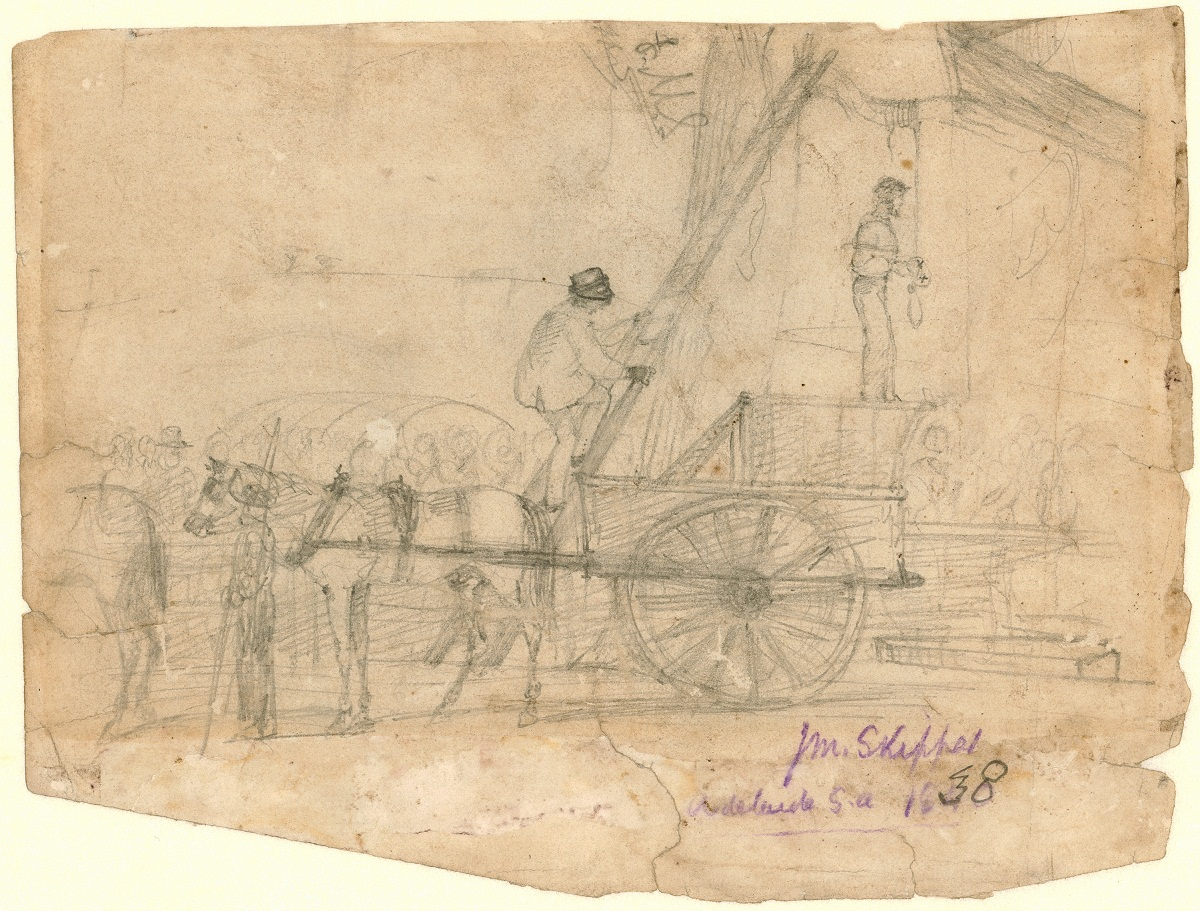
Pencil on paper sketch of the execution of Michael Magee, the first man executed in South Australia, for shooting at Sheriff Smart. The artwork is inscribed, "Sketched on the ground by J. M. Skipper" (suggesting the artist witnessed the execution). Held at the State Library of South Australia, call no. B 7797.

- Michael Magee – 2 May 1838 – The first public execution in South Australia. A runaway convict, hanged from a tree on Montefiore Hill for shooting at Sheriff Smart with intent to kill.
- Wang Nucha (Tommy Roundhead) – 31 May 1839 – Hanged in front of the government iron stores (very close to the site of Magee's hanging) for the murder of James Thompson on the Para River.
- Yerr-i-Cha (George) – 31 May 1839 – Hanged for the murder of William Duffield in the Gilles Plains area.
- George Hughes – 16 March 1840 – Hanged outside the Horse Police Barracks for theft and firing with murderous intent at the Para River.
- Henry Curran – 16 March 1840 – Hanged outside the Horse Police Barracks for theft and firing with murderous intent at the Para River.
- Mongarawata – 25 August 1840 – Hanged (by summary execution) by Major O'Halloran on the Coorong in retribution for the massacre of over fifteen passengers wrecked on the Maria.
- Pilgarie (Moorcan-gac) – 25 August 1840 – Hanged (by summary execution) by Major O'Halloran on the Coorong in retribution for the massacre of fifteen passengers wrecked on the Maria.
- Joseph Stagg – 18 November 1840 - Hanged for the murder of John Gofton near Torrens Island. The first public execution to be conducted outside Adelaide Gaol, with a crowd of roughly seven hundred in attendance.
- Nultia - 7 April 1843 Hanged upon a scaffold symbolically erected outside Biddle’s ransacked hut, 20 miles from Port Lincoln for the murder of Rolles Biddle.
- Ngarbi – 1 August 1843 – Hanged outside Adelaide Gaol for the murder of Elizabeth Stubbs at Port Lincoln.
- Wera Maldera ('Peter') – 28 March 1845 – Hanged outside Adelaide Gaol for the murder of George McGrath at McGrath's Flat, on the Coorong.
- Thomas Donnelly – 29 March 1847 – Hanged outside Adelaide Gaol for the murder of Kingberrie, an indigenous local, at Rivoli Bay.
- Keelgulla – 9 November 1849 – Hanged at the scene of the crime for the murder of Captain James Beevor at Mount Drummond (near Port Lincoln).
- Neulalta – 9 November 1849 – Hanged at the scene of the crime for the murder of Captain James Beevor at Mount Drummond (near Port Lincoln).
- Pullurunya – 9 November 1849 – Hanged at the scene of the crime for the murder of Captain James Beevor at Mount Drummond (near Port Lincoln).
- James Yates – 5 September 1850 – Hanged outside Adelaide Gaol for the murder of a shepherd named Jack Mansforth at Skillagolee Creek.
- William Wright – 12 March 1853 – Hanged outside Adelaide Gaol for the murder of a man known as Robert Head, committed at East Wellington.
- William Bell – 27 December 1854 – Hanged outside Adelaide Gaol for the murder of Theresa Wilhelmina Augusta Ulbrecht at Port Adelaide; this was the last public execution at Adelaide Gaol, with approximately three thousand onlookers.
- Weenpulta – 14 January 1856 – Hanged at Franklin Harbour for the murder of Peter Brown.
- Weellanna – 14 January 1856 – Hanged at Franklin Harbour for the murder of Peter Brown.
- Yardulunulkarna – 14 January 1856 – Hanged at Franklin Harbour for the murder of Peter Brown.
- Eelanna – 14 January 1856 – Hanged at Franklin Harbour for the murder of Peter Brown.

== 1860s to 1890s ==
- Manyetta – 5 October 1860 – Hanged at Streaky Bay for the murder of John Jones, a shepherd at 'Mount Joy' station near Mount Wedge.
- Pilti Miltinda (Bobby) – 7 June 1861 – Hanged at Adelaide Gaol for the murder of Mary Ann Rainberd (or Reinbert) and her two children near Kapunda.
- Tankaworty (Alick or Jimmy) – 7 June 1861 – Hanged at Adelaide Gaol for the murder of Mary Ann Rainberd and her two children near Kapunda.
- Warretya (Kop Robert) – 7 June 1861 – Hanged at Adelaide Gaol for the murder of Mary Ann Rainberd and her two children near Kapunda.
- Warretya (Gogeye Jimmy) – 7 June 1861 – Hanged at Adelaide Gaol for the murder of Mary Ann Rainberd and her two children near Kapunda.
- Nilgerie – 7 September 1861 – Hanged near the scene of the crime at Fowler's Bay for the murder of Theodore Gustavus Berggoist.
- Tilcherie – 7 September 1861 – Hanged near the scene of the crime at Fowler's Bay for the murder of Theodore Gustavus Berggoist.
- Mangiltie ('Jemmy') – 14 September 1861 – Hanged at Chiriroo (near Venus Bay) for the murder of Margaret Ann Impett at Mount Wedge.
- Karabidne ('Willy') – 14 September 1861 – Hanged at Chiriroo (near Venus Bay) for the murder of Margaret Ann Impett at Mount Wedge.
- John Seaver – 11 March 1862 – Hanged at Adelaide Gaol for the murder of Police Inspector Richard Pettinger at a ball at Government House, Adelaide.
- Meengulta (alias Maynulte, alias Uringi) – September 1862 – Hanged at Venus Bay for the murder of a hutkeeper, William Walker, at Kongarie (near Mount Wedge).
- Malachi Martin – 24 December 1862 – Hanged at Adelaide Gaol for the murder of Jane Macmanamin at Salt Creek.
- Carl Jung – 10 November 1871 – Hanged at Mount Gambier for the murder of Assistant Bailiff Thomas Garraway at Deep Gully, near Mount Gambier.
- Elizabeth Woolcock – 30 December 1873 – Hanged at Adelaide Gaol for the murder of Thomas Woolcock at North Yelta (the only woman executed in South Australia).
- William Ridgeway – 1 January 1874 – Hanged at Adelaide Gaol for the murder of Frederick Burt at 'Coonatto' station.
- William Page – 27 October 1875 – Hanged at Mount Gambier for the murder of Mary Julia Buchan.
- Charles Streitman - 24 July 1877 - Hanged at Adelaide Gaol for the murder of Robert Woodhead at Wallaroo.
- Hugh Fagan (alias James Lynch) - 15 April 1878 - Hanged at Adelaide Gaol for the murder of Patrick Bannon at Saltire.
- Jonathan Prest - 16 July 1878 - Hanged at Adelaide Gaol for the murder of his wife Mary Prest near Port Adelaide.
- Robert Johnson (alias William Nugent) – 18 November 1881 – Hanged at Mount Gambier for the murder of Trooper Harry Pearce.
- William Burns – 18 January 1883 – Hanged at Adelaide Gaol for the murder of Henry Loton on the high seas, off the Cape Verde Islands. "While waiting his doom, he formed an attachment to a young sparrow, which he tamed perfectly. He was greatly affected by the sight of the bird flitting about the scaffold while the preparations for his execution were in progress".
- Mah Poo (alias Charlie Bow) – 10 November 1883 – Hanged at Adelaide Gaol for the murder of Tommy Ah Fook in Hindley Street.
- William Brown (alias Allen, alias Lane)– 24 August 1894 – Hanged at Adelaide Gaol for the murder of George Morowsky at Waukaringa.
- George Lynch – 6 November 1895 – Hanged at Adelaide Gaol for the murder of Donald Ross at Balaklava.
- Joshua Beard – 10 July 1897 – Hanged at Adelaide Gaol for the murder of Walter Hall at Streaky Bay.

== 1900s to 1960s ==
- Lollie Kaser Singh – 17 January 1900 – Hanged at Adelaide Gaol for the murder of Sunda Singh at Denial Bay.
- Thomas Horton – 12 May 1904 - Hanged at Adelaide Gaol for the murder of his wife Florence in Rundle Street.
- Albert Bonfield – 5 January 1905 – Hanged at Adelaide Gaol for the murder of Caroline Hinds at Kensington Gardens.
- Notalle Habibulla – 16 November 1906 – Hanged at Adelaide Gaol for the murder of his wife Edith in Bristol Street, Adelaide.
- James Albert (Joe) Coleman – 2 July 1908 – Hanged at Adelaide Gaol for the murder of Constable Albert Ring at Glenelg.
- John Robins – 16 March 1910 – Hanged at Adelaide Gaol for the murder of Robert Ownsworth in Moonta-street, Adelaide.
- Hadji Khan – 5 April 1910 – Hanged at Adelaide Gaol for the murder of Said Mahommed at Frome Creek.
- Carlos Augusto Bonello – 5 May 1910 – Hanged at Adelaide Gaol for the murder of Emma Norma Plush at Siegersdorf (near Nuriootpa).
- Percival William Budd – 24 April 1919 – Hanged at Adelaide Gaol for the murder of Harold Jacques at Crystal Brook.
- Alexander Newland Lee – 15 July 1920 – Hanged at Adelaide Gaol for the murder of his wife and three children at Rhynie; Lee was the nephew of Martha Needle.
- William Henry Francis – 22 November 1927 – Hanged at Adelaide Gaol for the murder of his wife Myra at Rosaville, Mount Gambier.
- William Ephraim Haines – 16 December 1927 – Hanged at Adelaide Gaol for the murder of Devina Schmidt at Bridgewater.
- Frederick Carr – 12 November 1929 – Hanged at Adelaide Gaol for the murder of his wife Maude at Birkenhead.
- Thomas Blyth – 9 January 1930 – Hanged at Adelaide Gaol for the murder of his wife Sarah at Unley.
- Harold James Box – 26 April 1944 – Hanged at Adelaide Gaol for the murder of Albert Edmund (Lance) Brown at Gawler Place, Adelaide.
- Charles Patrick O'Leary – 14 November 1946 – Hanged at Adelaide Gaol for the murder of Walter 'Spoggy' Ballard at Nangwarry, near Penola.
- Alfred Coates Griffin – 22 March 1950 – Hanged at Adelaide Gaol for the murder of Elsie Wheeler at a Hutt Street boarding house.
- John Balaban – 26 August 1953 – Confessed to murdering five people, including his wife, her son and mother; hanged at Adelaide Gaol for the murder of Zora Kusic at Torrensville.
- William Henry Feast – 23 March 1956 – Hanged at Adelaide Gaol for the murder of Eunice Gwynne at Wingfield.
- Raymond John Bailey – 24 June 1958 – Convicted for the Sundown Murders; hanged at Adelaide Gaol for the murder of Thyra Bowman.
- Glen Sabre Valance – 24 November 1964 – Hanged at Adelaide Gaol for the murder of Richard Stang at 'Kooroon' Station. Last person to be executed in South Australia.
