= Susan Danby =

Australian researcher

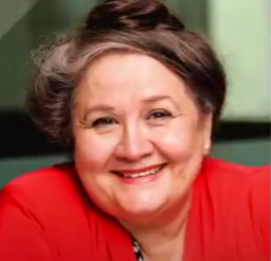
- Awards: Honorary Doctorate by Uppsala University in Sweden (2019); Fellow of the Academy of the Social Sciences in Australia (2021)
- Scientific career
- Fields: Education systems, linguistics, sociology
- Institutions: Queensland University of Technology
- Thesis: Interaction and social order in a preschool classroom.

Susan Danby is an Australian researcher and Distinguished Professor at the Queensland University of Technology. She is currently the Director of the Australian Research Council Centre of Excellence for the Digital Child. From 2012-2017, Danby was an Australian Research Council Future Fellow. From 2016-2018, she was a member of the Australian Research Council College of Experts. Danby specialises in early years language and social interaction, childhood studies, and young children's engagement with digital technologies.

Danby was elected a Fellow of the Academy of Social Sciences in Australia in 2021 in recognition of the international impact of her research into early childhoods and digital technologies.

== Education ==
Danby worked as an early years educator and teacher in Australia and in the United States of America.

Her qualifications include:

- PhD (Interaction and Social Order in Preschool), 1998, The University of Queensland, Australia
- Master of Education (Early Childhood), 1989, Loyola University, USA
- Bachelor of Educational Studies, 1983, The University of Queensland, Australia

== Academic career ==
Susan Danby's doctoral thesis was titled Interaction and social order in a preschool classroom. Her thesis won the 1999 Australian Association for Research in Education (AARE) Doctoral Thesis Award.

Danby's research has focused on children in palliative care, the rights of children within research, children's use of digital technology, and helplines for children

Danby is the Director of the ARC Centre of Excellence for the Digital Child, a research centre concerned with young children and digital technologies; The research centre is dedicated to the study of children's experiences of digital technology. She is an Editorial board Member for the journal Early Childhood Research Quarterly and the journal on Research on Children and Social Interaction.

She was awarded an honorary doctorate by the Uppsala University in recognition of her international leadership in early childhood language use and children's interaction with digital media. Danby delivered the 2023 Cunningham Lecture, a flagpship public lecture that is delivered each year by an esteemed social scientist.

== Notable publications ==
Danby has published over 200 scholarly works. Her most cited journal article on young children as active participants in educational research was published in the Australian Educational Researcher. Danby also edited a book, published by Springer Nature, on children's digital childhoods. According to the publisher, the work has been accessed over 49,000 times and achieved 121 citations.
