= Serdar Kuyucak =

Australian physicist

Serdar Kuyucak (born 19 February 1954) is a Turkish-born Australian physicist, an associate professor at the University of Sydney, Australia. His research interest include the study of ion transport across membrane channels using Brownian and molecular dynamics (BD and MD) methods and the solution of spectrum generating algebras (interacting boson model, vibron model) using the 1/N expansion method, and their application to problems in nuclear and molecular spectroscopy.

When at the Australian National University, he was awarded the status of Fellow in the American Physical Society, after being nominated by their Forum on International Physics in 2001, for codevelopment of the 1/N boson expansion technique for describing the properties of medium- to heavy- mass nuclei and for its extensions to high-spin states and subbarrier fusion as well as for his significant contributions to the promotion of international physics. He is also a Fellow of the Australian Institute of Physics.

== See also ==
- List of fellows of the American Physical Society (1998–2010)
