= Vecihi Başarın =

Turkish Australian historian and author

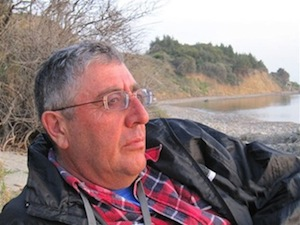
- Born: Vecihi Başarın; 1947 (age 78–79); Istanbul, Turkey
- Other name: John Basarin
- Occupation: Historian Author
- Spouse: Janneke Casson
- Website: http://www.friendsofgallipoli.org

Vecihi "John" BaşarınOAM (IPA: [ˈvedʒˈiːhiː ˈbaʃaɾɯn]; born 1947) is a Turkish Australian historian and author with a special interest in Gallipoli. His research has been instrumental in bringing a Turkish perspective to Australian migration and the ill-fated ANZAC campaign. He is a speaker on the subject of Gallipoli and has co-authored six books in both English and Turkish, used widely as resource material for schools, media, exhibitions and libraries. Başarın has written many articles and conference papers on his research and made guest appearances on television features and radio programs on Gallipoli.

For his outstanding service and individual efforts in uniting cultures, Başarın received the Victorian Premier's Award for Excellence in Multicultural Affairs in 2005.

In 2010, Başarın was recognised by the RSL as a contributor to understanding and world peace and awarded the ANZAC Peace Prize. He is the only Australian Turk to be so honoured. In 2015, for his long term dedication to telling the Gallipoli story from the Turkish perspective, he received an Order of Australia medal. Vecihi also has undertaken a Doctor of Philosophy degree at Deakin University which he successfully concluded at the age of 65! The topic of his research was “Why people go to Gallipoli on ANZAC Day?”

== Early life and career ==
Başarın was born and raised in Istanbul, Turkey. After completing his studies, he migrated to Australia in 1973 to pursue a career in Chemical Engineering. Working in the fields of energy and oil & gas engineering, Başarın has lived and worked in Australia, Norway, USA, Brazil, Germany and UK. After many years in management, in 2002 he created his own consultancy. His long term association with the Department of Industry saw Monash University award Başarın the title of Honorary Research Associate in 2003.

== Gallipoli historian ==
Throughout his adult life, Başarın has maintained an interest of and study in the World War I campaign at Gallipoli. His research has consistently explored both the ANZAC and Turkish viewpoints, detailed in the many publications he has co-authored. Each year, Başarın leads Anzac Day tours and provides an insightful narrative to Gallipoli visitors.

For a decade, Başarın was involved with the AE2- Australian submarine project. Acting as Turkish advisor to the 25-strong team, he travelled to Turkey to survey the submarine in 2007. His brainchild AE2 Plaque Project has been implemented in Sydney, Fremantle and at Gallipoli.

Başarın has been working as a Research Fellow with Prof John Hall of Deakin University Business School, publishing research papers such as:

- Reflections on Anzac Day : from one millennium to the next, 2010
- An empirical analysis of attendance at a commemorative event: Anzac Day at Gallipoli, 2010

In March 2012, he has completed his doctoral studies on matters relating to motives of attendance at the Anzac Day commemorative events at Gallipoli. Dr Basarin's PhD thesis is titled "Battlefield Tourism: Anzac Day commemorations at Gallipoli- An Empirical Analysis".

== ANZAC Peace Prize ==
Announced in April annually, The ANZAC Peace Prize is awarded by the RSL to "recognise any outstanding effort by an Australian citizen who has promoted the concept of international understanding and who, in so doing, has made a contribution to world peace." In 2010, the RSL ANZAC Awards Committee awarded The ANZAC Peace Prize to Vecihi Başarın "in recognition of his sustained and enthusiastic commitment to promote relationships between Australia and other communities around the world, particularly in Turkey, with a significant emphasis on his commitment to Rotary Youth Exchange programs and building understanding of the Gallipoli Campaign."

== Awards and recognition ==
- 2015 Order of Australia OAM Medal
- 2010 ANZAC Peace Prize
- 2005 Victorian Premier's Award for Excellence in Multicultural Affairs
- 2003 Monash University Honorary Research Associate

== Books ==
=== With Hatice Başarın ===
Published by Allen and Unwin:

- The Turks in Australia, Melbourne, 1993
- Beneath the Dardanelles; The Australian submarine at Gallipoli, Sydney, 2008

=== With Dr Kevin Fewster and Hatice Başarın ===
- A Turkish View of Gallipoli, Melbourne, 1985
- Gallipoli – The Turkish Story, Sydney, 2003
- Gelibolu 1915, Istanbul, 2005
- Canakkale Bogazinin Derinliklerinde, Istanbul, 2009
- Gallipoli - The Invasion, Istanbul, 2015
