= Brian Fitzgerald (academic) =

Australian legal academic and barrister

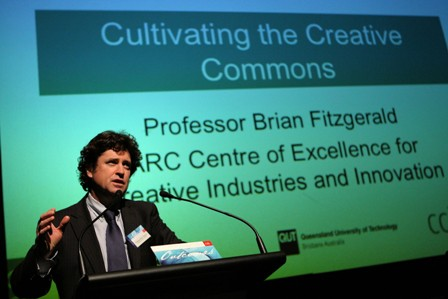
- Brian Fitzgerald at the ARC Graeme Clark Research Outcomes Forum at Parliament House in Canberra June 2008
- Education: Queensland University of Technology, Oxford University, Harvard University, Griffith University
- Occupations: Academic, barrister, lawyer
- Employer: Australian Catholic University
- Relatives: Professor Anne Fitzgerald (sister)

Brian Fitzgerald is an Australian legal academic and barrister. He is an intellectual property and information technology/internet lawyer who has pioneered the teaching of internet/cyber law in Australia. Fitzgerald was a specialist research professor at the Queensland University of Technology (QUT) until February 2012, when he became the inaugural executive dean of law at the Australian Catholic University's Faculty of Law and Business.

== Education and career ==
Fitzgerald studied arts at Griffith University and law at the Queensland University of Technology, graduating with first-class honours, and as University Medallist in Law, before going on to postgraduate study at the University of Oxford (BCL), Harvard University (LLM) and Griffith University (PhD). In 1998 he was named as QUT Law Faculty's Alumnus of the Year.

From 1998 to 2002, Fitzgerald was head of the School of Law and Justice at Southern Cross University, and from 2002 to 2007 he was head of the School of Law at QUT. Since March 2012 he has been the executive dean of law at the Australian Catholic University, based in Melbourne.

Fitzgerald is a chief investigator and program leader for law in the Australian Research Council Centre of Excellence on Creative Industries and Innovation. He is also the project leader of Creative Commons Australia and Peer to Patent Australia and is member of the Access to and Use of Public sector Information (auPSI) project. He was project leader for the Open Access to Knowledge Law (OAK Law) Project studying legal protocols for open access for the Australian research sector, and for the Legal Framework for e-Research Project.

His current projects include work on intellectual property issues across the areas of copyright, digital content and the internet, copyright and the creative industries in China, open content licensing and the Creative Commons, free and open source software, research use of patents, patent informatics administration licensing, Science Commons, e-research, licensing of digital entertainment and anti-circumvention law.

Professor Fitzgerald was a member of the Government 2.0 Taskforce set up by the Australian Government in 2009. This taskforce produced its report, "Engage: Getting on with Government 2.0", in December 2009.

Fitzgerald has been featured in The Sydney Morning Herald, The Science Show, and The Law Report discussing copyright related legal issues.

== Books ==
- Internet and Ecommerce Law, Business and Policy (2011) ISBN 978-978-022-796-8
- Cyberlaw: Cases and Materials on the Internet, Digital Intellectual Property and E Commerce (2002) ISBN 978-1-86316-208-1
- Jurisdiction and the Internet (2004) ISBN 978-0-455-21987-5
- Legal Issues Relating to Free and Open Source Software (2004) ISBN 978-0-9751394-0-0
- Intellectual Property in Principle (2004) ISBN 978-0-455-21894-6
- Internet and Ecommerce Law (2007) ISBN 978-0-455-22263-9
- Games and law: History, content, practice and law (2007) ISBN 978-1-920898-51-9
- Copyright Law, Digital Content and the Internet in the Asia Pacific (2008) ISBN 978-1-920898-72-4
- Legal Framework for e-Research: Realising the Potential (2008) ISBN 978-1-920898-93-9
- Going Digital 2000 (2000) ISBN 978-1-86316-150-3

== See also ==
- Australian copyright law
- Copyright Scholars
- Computer Law
