= Toby Miller =

British/Australian-American cultural studies and media studies scholar (born 1958)

- Born: Bruce Toby Andrew Miller; 9 August 1958 (age 68)
- Citizenship: British, Australian
- Education: Australian National University (B.A., 1980); Murdoch University (PhD, 1991)
- Scientific career
- Fields: Social sciences; incl. Cultural studies, Media studies
- Workplaces: New York University (1993–2004}; University of California, Riverside (2004–2013)
- Website: http://www.tobymiller.org/

Bruce Toby Andrew Miller (9 August 1958) is a British/Australian-American cultural studies and media studies scholar. He is the author of several books and articles. He was chair of the Department of Media & Cultural Studies at the University of California, Riverside, and he is the Editor-in-Chief of the open-access journal Open Cultural Studies.

== Biography ==
Miller was born on 9 August 1958 in the United Kingdom and grew up in England, India, and Australia. He earned a B.A. in history and political science at Australian National University in 1980 and a PhD in philosophy and communication studies at Murdoch University in 1991.

In July 2004, Miller became a full-time professor at the University of California, Riverside (UCR) following a stint as a visiting professor. Formerly, he was a professor in the Departments of English, Sociology, and Women's Studies, as well as director of the program in film and visual culture. As of December 2008, he chaired the new Department of Media & Cultural Studies. He retired emeritus in 2013. Preceding his professorship at UCR, Miller was a professor at New York University 1993–2004 and he held previous appointments at Murdoch University, Griffith University, and the University of New South Wales.

Professor Miller later held a Faculty of Excellence Professor position at Tecnológico de Monterrey in Mexico. He is Editor-in-Chief of the open-access journal Open Cultural Studies, published by De Gruyter.

== Selected publications ==
Miller's work has been translated into Chinese, Japanese, Swedish, and Spanish.

=== Articles ===
- Orozco, Guillermo; Miller, Toby (2016). "Television in Latin America Is "Everywhere": Not Dead, Not Dying, but Converging and Thriving". Media and Communication. 4 (3): 99–108. doi:10.17645/mac.v4i3.592.

=== Books and monographs ===
- Miller, Toby (1993). The well-tempered self: citizenship, culture, and the postmodern subject. Baltimore, Maryland: Johns Hopkins University Press. ISBN 9780801846045.
- Miller, Toby; Cunningham, Stuart (1994). Contemporary Australian television. Sydney, New South Wales, Australia: University of New South Wales Press. ISBN 9780868403977.
- Miller, Toby (1997). The avengers. London: British Film Institute. ISBN 9780851705583.
- Miller, Toby (1998). Technologies of truth: cultural citizenship and the popular media. Minneapolis: University of Minnesota Press. ISBN 9780816629855.
- Miller, Toby; McHoul, Alec (1998). Popular culture and everyday life. London Thousand Oaks, California New Delhi: SAGE Publications. ISBN 9780761952138.
- Miller, Toby; Martin, Randy (1999). SportCult. Minneapolis: University of Minnesota Press. ISBN 9780816631841.
- Miller, Toby; Stam, Robert (2000). Film and theory: an anthology. Malden, Mass: Blackwell. ISBN 9780631206262.
- Miller, Toby; Lawrence, Geoffrey; McKay, Jim; Rowe, David (2001). Globalization and sport: playing the world. London Thousand Oaks, California New Delhi: SAGE Publications. ISBN 9780761959694.
- Miller, Toby; Govil, Nitin; McMurria, John; Maxwell, Richard (2001). Global Hollywood 1. London: British Film Institute. ISBN 9780851708454.
- Miller, Toby (2001). Sportsex. Philadelphia: Temple University Press. ISBN 9781566399944.
- Miller, Toby (2002). Television studies. London: British Film Institute. ISBN 9780851708959.
- Miller, Toby; Yudice, George (2002). Cultural policy. London Thousand Oaks, California New Delhi: SAGE Publications. ISBN 9780761952411.
- Miller, Toby; Lewis, Justin (2003). Critical cultural policy studies: a reader. Malden, Massachusetts: Blackwell Pub. ISBN 9780631223009.
- Miller, Toby (2003). Spyscreen: espionage on film and TV from the 1930s to the 1960s. Oxford New York: Oxford University Press. ISBN 9780198159520.
- Miller, Toby (2003). Television: critical concepts in media and cultural studies. London: Routledge. ISBN 9780415255028.
- Miller, Toby; Stam, Robert (2004). A companion to film theory. Oxford: Blackwell. ISBN 9780631206453.
- Miller, Toby; Govil, Nitin; McMurria, John; Maxwell, Richard; Wang, Ting (2005). Global Hollywood 2. London: British Film Institute. ISBN 9781844570393.
- Miller, Toby (2006) [2001]. A companion to cultural studies (2nd ed.). Malden, Massachusetts: Blackwell Publishing. ISBN 9781405141758.
- Miller, Toby (2007). Cultural citizenship cosmopolitanism, consumerism, and television in a neoliberal age. Philadelphia: Temple University Press. ISBN 9781592135622.
- Miller, Toby (2008). Makeover nation: the United States of reinvention. Columbus: Ohio State University Press. ISBN 9780814251690.
- Miller, Toby; Creeber, Glen; Tulloch, John (2008) [2001]. The television genre book (2nd ed.). Houndmills, Basingstoke, Hampshire New York, New York: Palgrave Macmillan on behalf of the British Film Institute. ISBN 9781844572182.
- Miller, Toby (2009). The contemporary Hollywood reader. London: Routledge. ISBN 9780415452267.
- Miller, Toby (2010). Television studies: the basics. London New York: Routledge. ISBN 9780415774246.
- Miller, Toby; Maxwell, Richard (2012). Greening the media. New York: Oxford University Press. ISBN 9780199914678.
- Miller, Toby (2012). Blow up the humanities. Philadelphia: Temple University Press. ISBN 9781439909836.

=== Chapters in books ===
- Miller, Toby (2011), "The Media-Military Industrial Complex", in Steven Best; Richard Kahn; Anthony J. Nocella II; Peter McLaren (eds.), The Global Industrial Complex: Systems of Domination, Rowman & Littlefield, pp. 97–115, ISBN 978-0739136980
- Miller, Toby (2015), "Delivering the male – and more: fandom and media sport", in Carter, Cynthia; Steiner, Linda; McLaughlin, Lisa (eds.), The Routledge companion to media & gender, London New York: Routledge, pp. 461–472, ISBN 9781138849129.
