= Pfleiderer =

Pfleiderer GmbH
- Type: GmbH
- Industry: Building materials
- Founded: 1894
- Founder: Gustav Adolf Pfleiderer
- Headquarters: Düsseldorf, Germany
- Key people: Michael Wolff (CEO and chairman of the executive board)
- Products: surface finished wood products
- Revenue: €1.491 billion (2010)
- Operating income: ▼ (€582.9 million) (2010)
- Net income: ▼ (€727.8 million) (2010)
- Total assets: €1.418 billion (end 2010)
- Total equity: €42.0 million (end 2010)
- Number of employees: 5,370 (end 2010)
- Website: pfleiderer.com

Pfleiderer GmbH (formerly Pfleiderer AG) is a formerly listed company headquartered in the German city of Neumarkt in der Oberpfalz, Germany. The company specializes in the production of wood-based materials, especially medium-density fibreboard and particle board. As of 2012, Pfleiderer employed around 3100 people at eight different plants located in Germany and Poland. The company is Germany's market leader in the laminated particle board market. Since 2012, Pfleiderer is a 100% subsidiary of Atlantik S.A. from Luxembourg.

The company was founded in 1894 in the town of Heilbronn and grew to one of Europe's largest producers of wood-based materials. When management was taken over by Hans Overdiek in 2003, a policy of rapid expansion was started. The company became excessively leveraged and made overpriced acquisitions, aimed primarily at the later struggling U.S. housing market. When the real estate crisis came to a head in 2008, Pfleiderer's high debt load turned into a financial disaster which led the company into bankruptcy in March 2012. With almost one billion euros of net debt, Pfleiderer became one of the largest corporate failures of recent German history.

In 2006, the track system unit was sold to AXA Private Equity.

As of 2013, the company has successfully emerged from bankruptcy. This was mostly achieved by the sale of many business units, including the laminate business and all North American activities.

Since January 2016 the company belongs to Pfleiderer Group, headquartered in Wrocław (Poland) and listed on the Warsaw Stock Exchange.
