= Capital punishment in Australia =

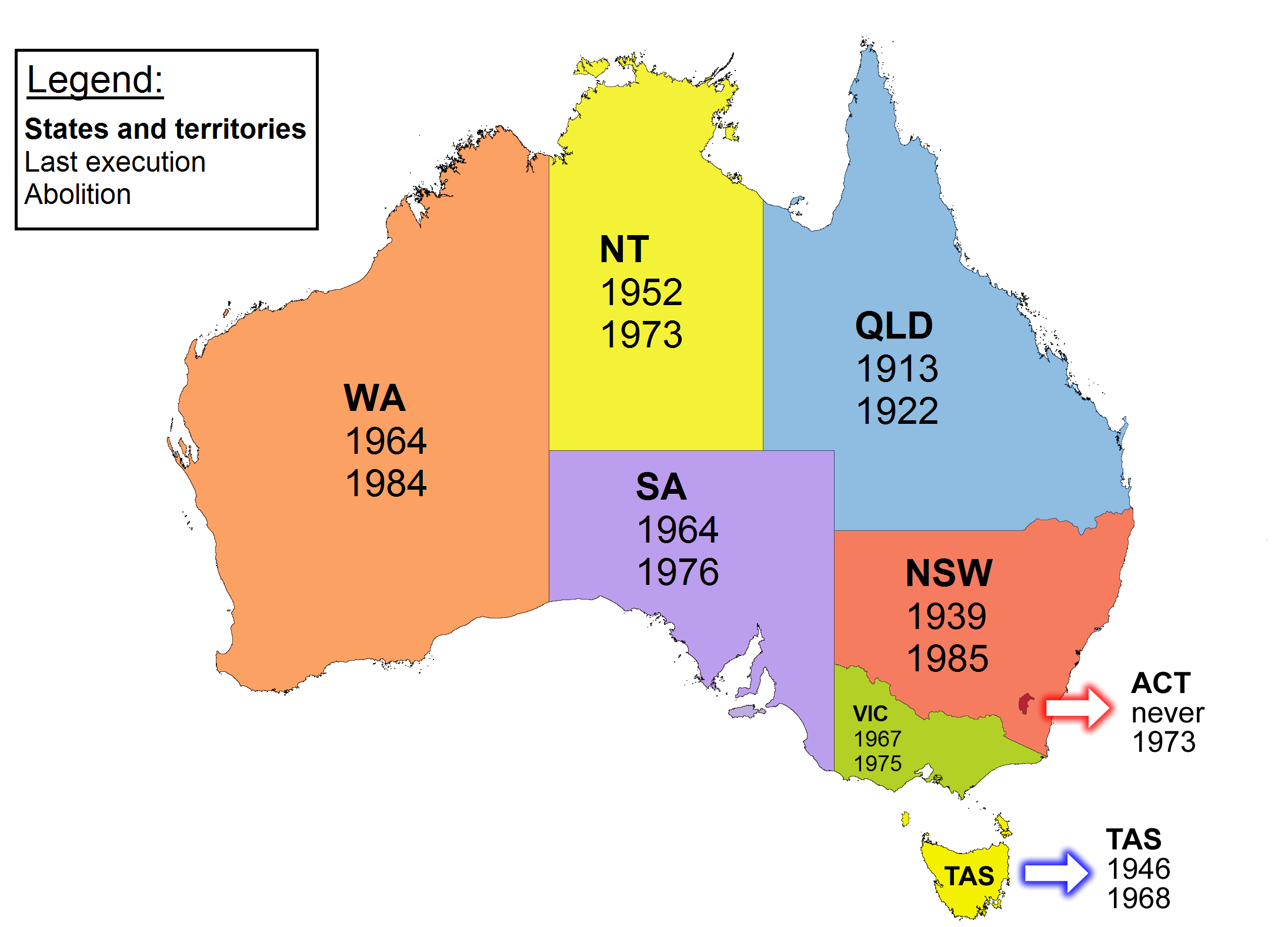
Map featuring the year of the last execution and the year of abolition

Capital punishment in Australia has been abolished in all jurisdictions since 1985. Queensland abolished the death penalty in 1922. Tasmania did the same in 1968. The Commonwealth abolished the death penalty in 1973, with application also in the Australian Capital Territory and the Northern Territory. Victoria did so in 1975, South Australia in 1976, and Western Australia in 1984. New South Wales abolished the death penalty for murder in 1955, and for all crimes in 1985. In 2010, the Commonwealth Parliament passed legislation prohibiting the re-establishment of capital punishment by any state or territory. Australian law prohibits the extradition or deportation of a prisoner to another jurisdiction if they could be sentenced to death for any crime.

The last execution in Australia took place in 1967, when Ronald Ryan was hanged in Victoria following his conviction for killing a prison officer while escaping from Pentridge Prison. Between Ryan's execution in 1967 and 1984, several more people were sentenced to death, but had their sentences commuted to life imprisonment. The last death sentence was given in August 1984, when Brenda Hodge was sentenced to death in Western Australia (and subsequently had her sentence commuted to life imprisonment).

25 women were executed in Australia between 1789 and 1951.

== History ==
Execution statistics by state (since Federation in 1901)
Western Australia	33
New South Wales	23
Victoria	22
South Australia	20
Queensland	19
Northern Territory	5
Tasmania	3
Total	125
Norfolk Island (see below)	30+

Before the arrival of Europeans, death sentences were carried out under Aboriginal customary law, either directly or through sorcery. In some cases the condemned could be denied mortuary rites. The first executions carried out under European law in Australia took place in Western Australia in 1629, when Dutch authorities hanged the mutineers of the Batavia.

Capital punishment had been part of the legal system of Australia since British settlement. During the 19th century, crimes that could carry a death sentence included burglary, sheep stealing, forgery, sexual assaults, murder and manslaughter, and in Tasmania there were seven men who were executed for "being illegally at large". During the 19th century, these crimes saw about 80 people hanged each year throughout Australia.

Australian states and territories had laws against homosexuality during the colonial era, and nineteenth-century colonial parliaments retained provisions which made homosexual activity a capital offence until 1861. Most jurisdictions removed capital punishment as a sentence for homosexual activity, although in Victoria it remained as such when committed while also inflicting bodily harm or to a person younger than the age of fourteen until 1949.

Tasmania recorded nine executions for sodomy, termed as "unnatural crime". These executions occurred between 1830 and 1863, suggesting that the previously cited figure of seven for all of Australia is a significant undercount. Of the nine Tasmanian cases, eight involved victims who were children or non-consenting parties. The remaining case, that of Joseph Fogg executed in 1830, involved an adult male named William Newport, but available records do not establish whether the act was consensual.

Before Federation, each colony made its own criminal laws and punishments. Since then the States have been responsible for most criminal law. Since Federation in 1901, 114 people have been legally executed in Australia (excluding the historical territories of New Guinea and Papua where executions occurred under Australian law). For lists of people executed in Australia, sorted by state or territory, see the sidebar.

== Federal jurisdictions ==
=== Commonwealth law ===
In 1973 the Death Penalty Abolition Act 1973 of the Commonwealth abolished the death penalty for federal offences. It provided in Section 3 that the Act applied to any offence against a law of the Commonwealth, the Territories or under an Imperial Act, and in s. 4 that "[a] person is not liable to the punishment of death for any offence".

No executions were ever carried out under Commonwealth criminal laws, and the passage of the Death Penalty Abolition Act 1973 saw the death penalty replaced with life imprisonment as the maximum punishment. On 11 March 2010, Federal Parliament passed laws that prevent the death penalty from being reintroduced by any state in Australia, by amending the Death Penalty Abolition Act 1973 to include the states. The Commonwealth will not extradite or deport a prisoner to another jurisdiction if they could be sentenced to death for any crime. A recent case involving this was the case of American Gabe Watson, who was convicted of the manslaughter of his wife in North Queensland, and faced capital murder charges in his home state of Alabama. His deportation was delayed until the government received assurances that he would not be executed if found guilty.

==== War Crimes Act 1945 ====
Following the conclusion of World War II, the Chifley government passed the War Crimes Act 1945, allowing for the trial of Japanese military personnel and collaborators accused of war crimes in Australian territories. Those trials were separate to the International Military Tribunal for the Far East separately convened by the Allied powers for the trial of Japanese civilian leaders.

A total of 137 people were executed under the War Crimes Act 1945, with the final executions taking place on Manus Island in 1951. Most trials were held in New Guinea, although three took place in Darwin; 300 trials were held for 807 accused, with approximately two-thirds convicted and 226 death sentences imposed. Trials were carried out by the military and were initially not subject to review by civilian authorities. Given the large numbers of executions, there were administrative challenges in finding soldiers willing to make up firing squads and in finding qualified hangmen.

=== Military jurisdiction ===
The Defence Act 1903 provided that courts-martial could sentence Australian military personnel to death for mutiny, desertion to the enemy, traitorous surrender to the enemy, or traitorous correspondence with the enemy, but that "no sentence of death passed by any court-martial shall be carried into effect until confirmed by the Governor-General". It has been suggested that the latter provision derived from the case of Breaker Morant, an Australian soldier who was executed while serving under British authority during the Second Boer War despite the opposition of the Australian government.

During World War I, over 120 Australian soldiers were sentenced to death by courts-martial, but the Fisher and Hughes governments commuted all death sentences. This contrasted with the over 300 executions of soldiers for desertion and other offences carried out by other British Empire militaries.

While capital punishment in the military was abolished by the Death Penalty Abolition Act 1973, the provisions for the death penalty in the Defence Act 1903 were not formally removed until the passage of the Defence Force Re-organization Act 1975.

=== Federal territories ===
==== Australian Capital Territory ====
No executions were carried out in the Australian Capital Territory (ACT) between its creation in 1911 and the abolition of capital punishment. The criminal laws of New South Wales initially continued in the territory under the Seat of Government (Administration) Act 1910. However, all death sentences imposed in the territory were commuted to life imprisonment.

The Crimes Ordinance 1968 removed the death penalty for all offences in the ACT except for murder and treason. The federal Death Penalty Abolition Act 1973 abolished capital punishment in the ACT, although it was not removed from the local statute book until the passage of the Crimes (Amendment) Ordinance 1983.

==== Norfolk Island ====
Between 1800 and 1846, over 30 people were executed on Norfolk Island, which was a penal colony at the time. On one day in 1846, William Westwood and 11 other convicts were hanged for their involvement in the Cooking Pot Uprising.

==== Northern Territory ====
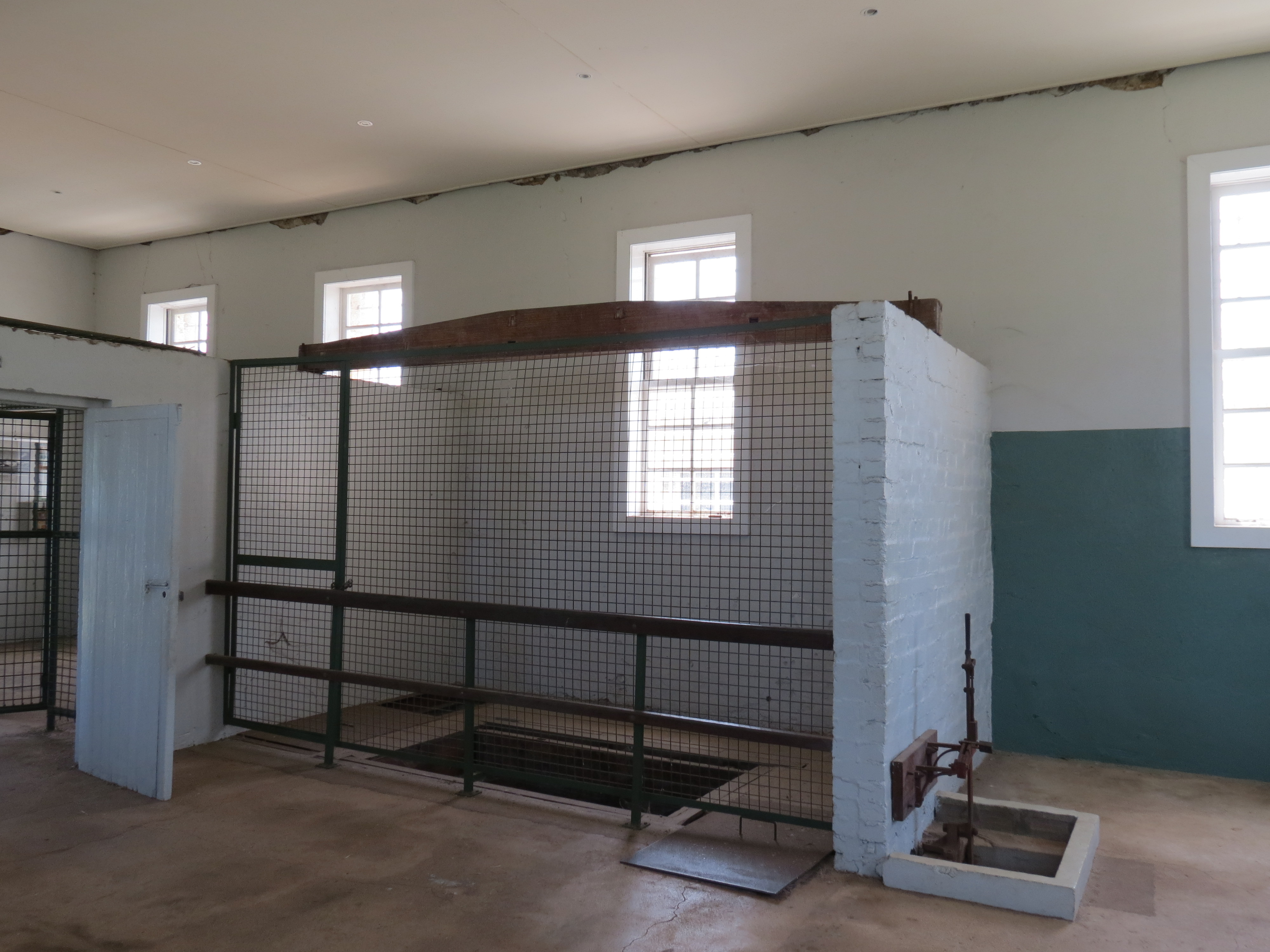
The former gallows at Fannie Bay Gaol

There were nine executions between 1893 and 1952. Seven of them took place at Fannie Bay Gaol, the other two at regional locations close to where the crime took place. The last execution in the Northern Territory was a double hanging at Fannie Bay Gaol on 8 August 1952.

The death penalty was abolished in the Northern Territory via an ordinance passed by the Northern Territory Legislative Council, which came into effect on 5 April 1973. It was introduced as a private member's bill by Richard Ward, which passed by twelve votes to three. While the ordinance abolished all existing capital offences, the federal Death Penalty Abolition Act 1973 which passed several months later removed any further possibility for capital punishment in federal territories.

== State jurisdictions ==
=== New South Wales ===
The last execution in New South Wales was carried out on 24 August 1939, when John Trevor Kelly was hanged at Sydney's Long Bay Correctional Centre for the murder of Marjorie Constance Sommarlad. New South Wales abolished the death penalty for murder in 1955, but retained it as a potential penalty for treason, piracy, and arson in naval dockyards until 1985. New South Wales was the last Australian state to formally abolish the death penalty for all crimes.

=== Queensland ===
A total of 94 people were hanged in the Moreton Bay/Queensland region from 1830 until 1913. The last person hanged was Ernest Austin on 22 September 1913 for the rape and murder of 11-year-old Ivy Mitchell.

The only woman to be hanged was Ellen Thompson (born 1846–1847?) on 13 June 1887; she was hanged alongside her lover, John Harrison, for murdering her husband William. The likelihood of a miscarriage of justice in the conviction and sentence is explored by Vashti Farrer who concluded: "the scales were weighted her as the stereotypical "loose woman" capable of murder".

In 1922, Queensland became the first part of the British Commonwealth to abolish the death penalty. The Legislative Assembly of Queensland voted 33 to 30 to abolish the death penalty.

=== South Australia ===
The Adelaide Gaol was the site of forty-four hangings, from Joseph Stagg on 18 November 1840 to Glen Sabre Valance, murderer and rapist, on 24 November 1964. Three executions also occurred at Mount Gambier Gaol, five at country locations out of Port Lincoln, three at Franklin Harbor, one at Streaky Bay and two at Fowler's Bay.

Two Ngarrindjeri men were controversially executed by hanging along the Coorong on 22 August 1840, after a drumhead court-martial conducted by Police Commissioner O'Halloran on the orders of Governor George Gawler. The men were found to be guilty of murdering the twenty-five survivors of the shipwreck Maria a few months before.

Elizabeth Woolcock, the only woman ever to have been executed under South Australian law, was hanged on 30 December 1873. Her body was not released to the family and was buried between the inner and outer walls of the prison, identified by a number and the date of the execution.

In the late 1950s, Don Dunstan became well known for his campaign against the death penalty being imposed on Max Stuart, who was convicted of rape and murder of a young girl, opposing then-Premier Thomas Playford IV over the matter.

In 1976, under the premiership of then-Premier Dunstan, the Criminal Law Consolidation Act 1935 (SA) was modified so that the death sentence was changed to life imprisonment. The Legislative Assembly voted 28 to 16 votes.

=== Tasmania ===
In the early days of colonial rule, Tasmania, then known as Van Diemen's Land, was the site of penal transports. Mary McLauchlan was convicted in 1830 for infanticide; she was sentenced to both death and dissection. She was the first woman to be hanged in Tasmania.

The last execution was on 14 February 1946, when Frederick Thompson was hanged for the murder of eight-year-old Evelyn Maughan. The death penalty was abolished in 1968.

=== Victoria ===
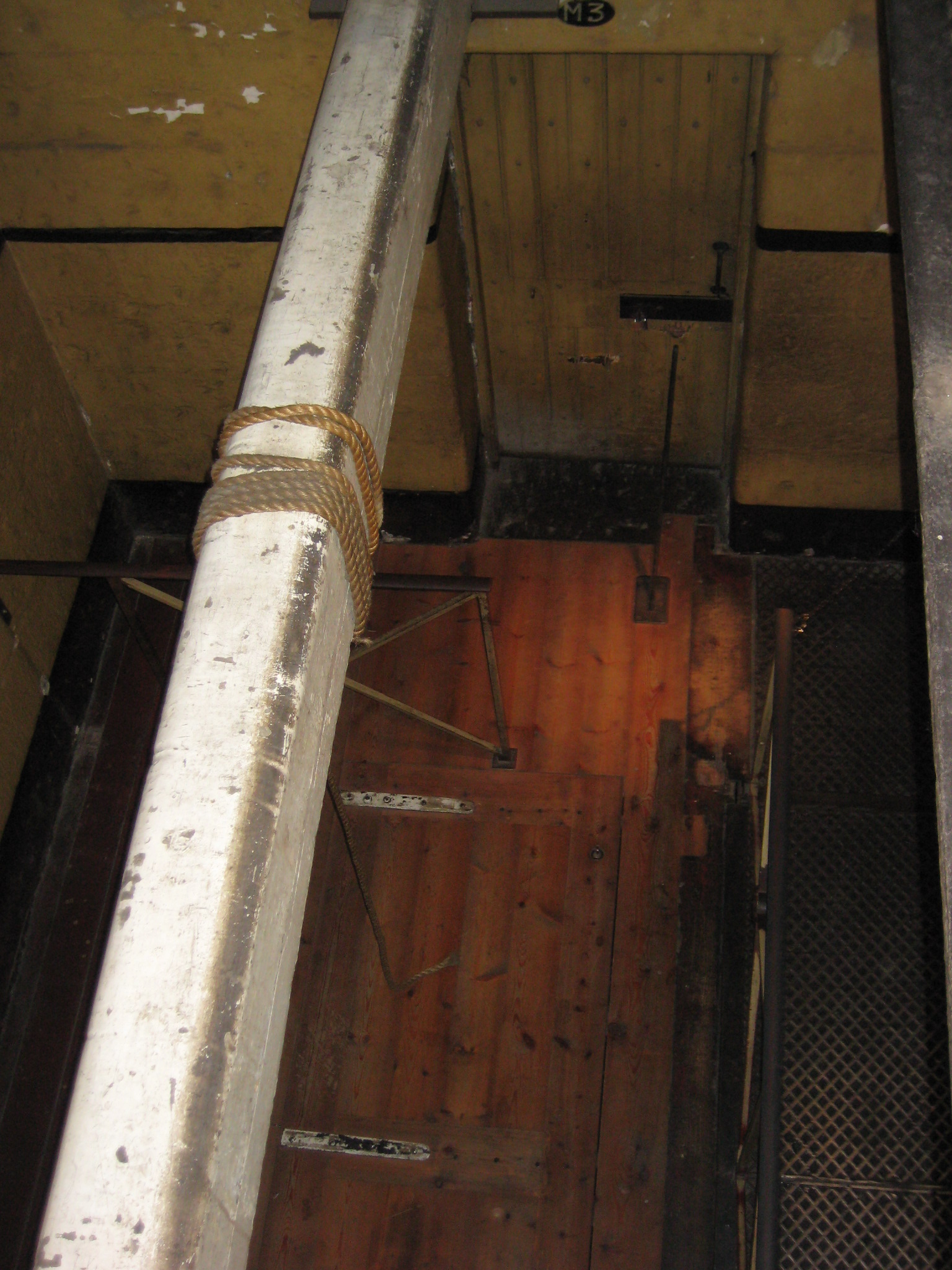
Old Melbourne Gaol gallows

Victoria's first executions occurred in 1842 when two Aboriginal men, Tunnerminnerwait and Maulboyheenner, were hanged outside the site of the Melbourne Gaol for the killing of two whalers in the Westernport district. Ronald Ryan was the last man executed at Pentridge Prison and in Australia. He was hanged on 3 February 1967 after being convicted of shooting dead a prison officer during an escape from Pentridge Prison, Coburg, Victoria in 1965.

Victoria was also the state of the last woman executed in Australia: Jean Lee was hanged in 1951. She was accused of being an accomplice in the murder of 73-year-old William ('Pop') Kent. She, along with her accomplices, were executed on 19 February 1951. Victoria would not carry out another execution until that of Ronald Ryan.

Not all those executed were murderers: for instance, Albert McNamara was hanged for arson causing death in 1902, and David Bennett was hanged in 1932 after being convicted of raping a four-year-old girl. Bennett was the last man to be hanged in Australia for an offence other than murder.

This number includes triple murderer Edward Leonski, executed by the U.S. Army in 1942.

The beam and trapdoor used to execute condemned prisoners were removed from Old Melbourne Gaol and installed in D Division at Pentridge Prison by the condemned child rapist David Bennett, who was a carpenter by trade. It was used for all 10 Pentridge hangings (including a double hanging). After Victoria abolished capital punishment in 1975, the beam and trapdoor were removed and put into storage. The beam was reinstalled at the Old Melbourne Gaol in August 2000, although the trapdoor had been modified during installation at Pentridge and no longer fitted.

The vote to abolish the Death penalty in Victoria 1975 was the following, in the Victorian Legislative Assembly was 36–30 in favour, in the Victorian Legislative Council was 20–13 for abolition. All 9 Labor members in the Legislative Council, 11 Liberal members voted in favour. 7 Liberals and all 6 Country voted against.

=== Western Australia ===
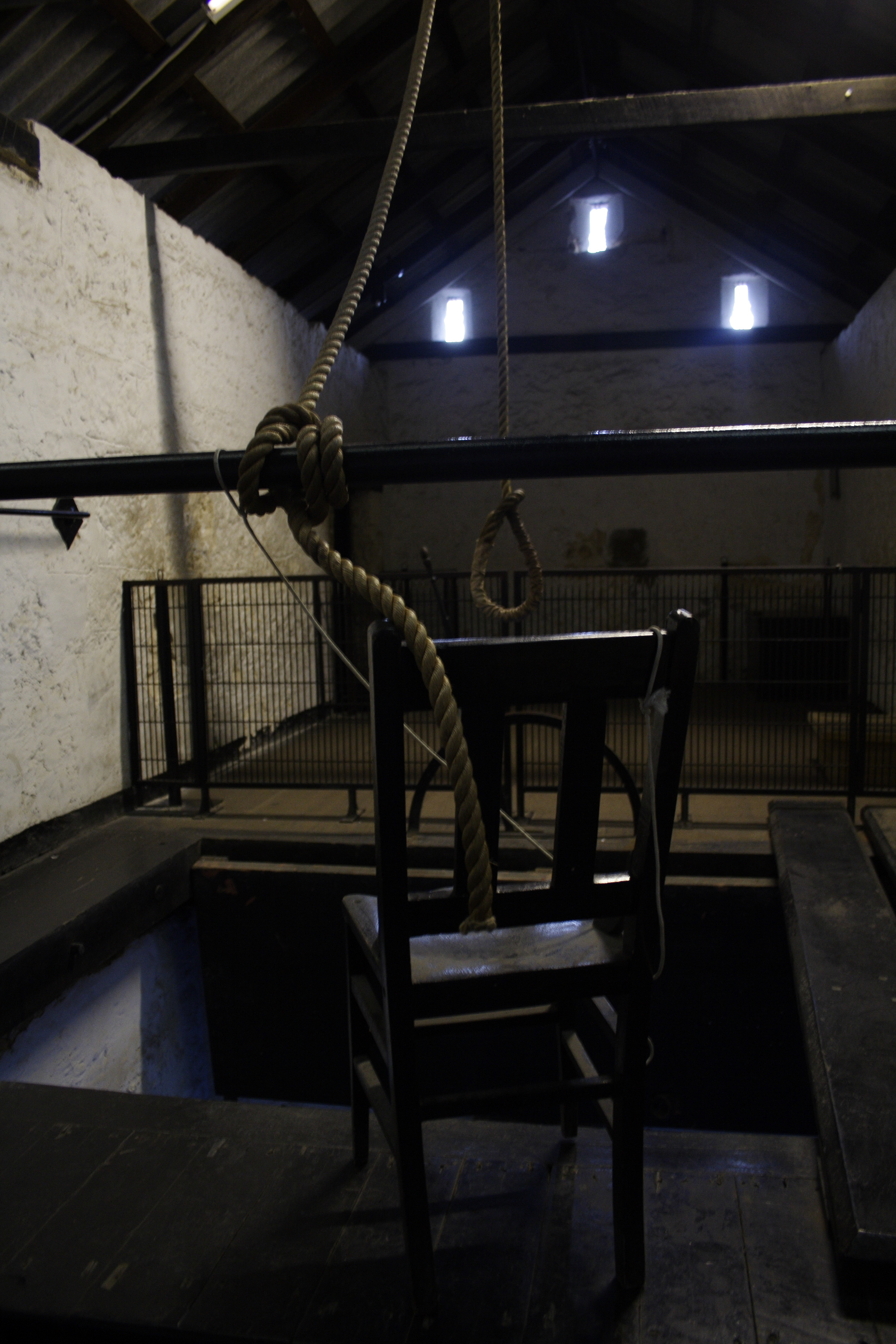
The Fremantle Prison gallows, last used in 1964

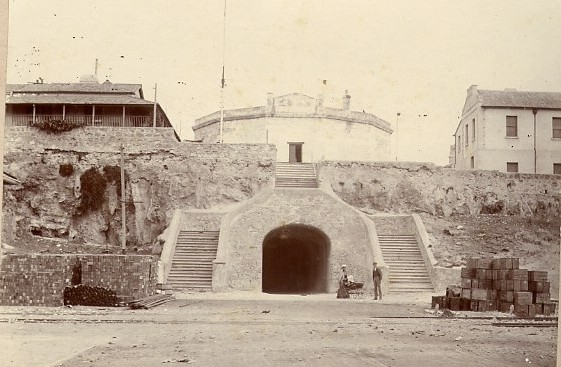
John Gavin was hanged outside the Fremantle Round House

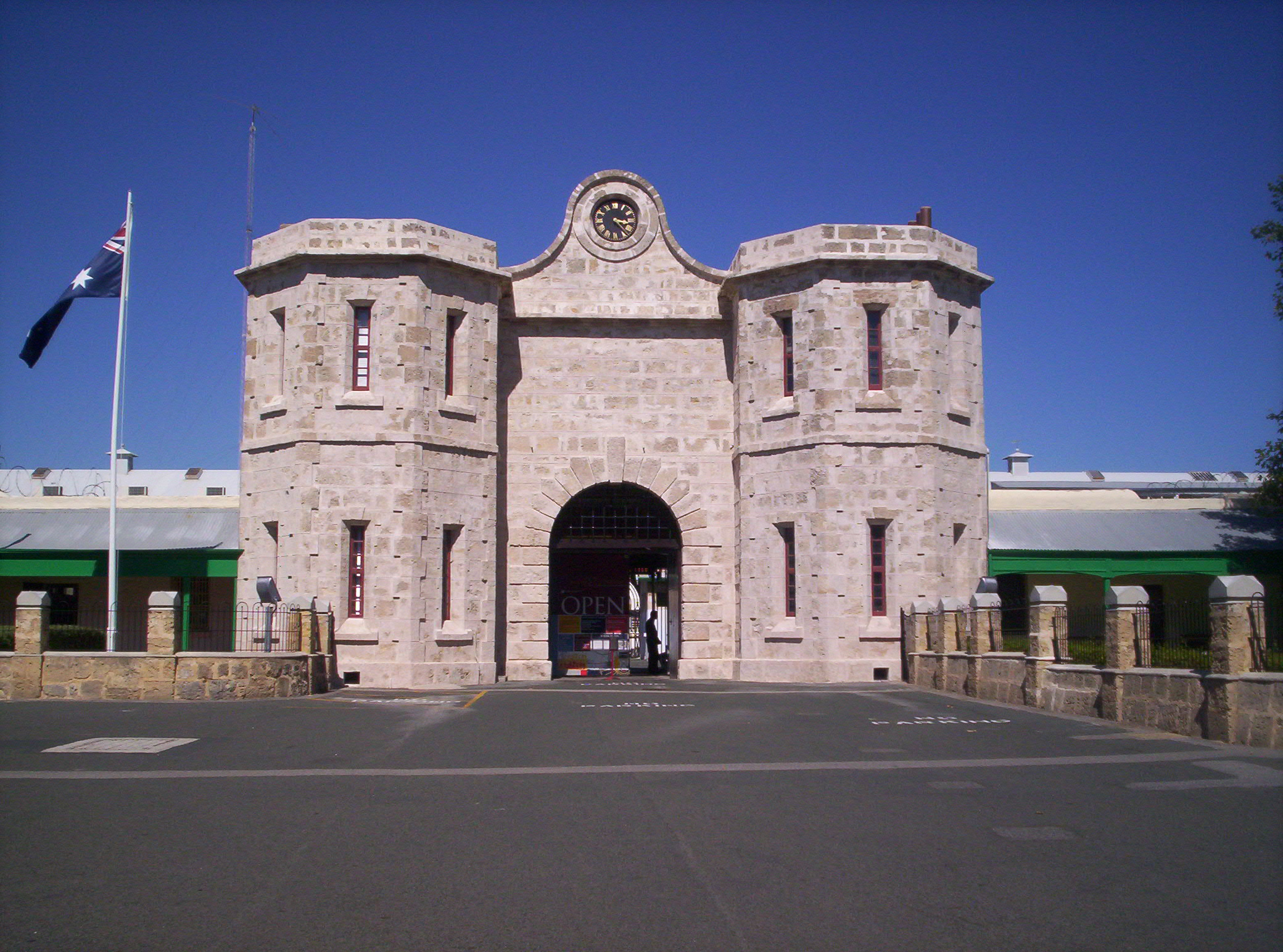
Fremantle Prison

In Western Australia, the first legal executions were under Dutch VOC law on 2 October 1629 on Long Island, Houtman Abrolhos (near Geraldton), when Jeronimus Corneliszoon and six others were hanged as party to the murders of 125 men, women and children.

Following British colonization, between 1833 and 1855 executions by firing squad and hanging were performed at a variety of places, often at the site of the offence. Even with the construction of the new Perth Gaol in 1855 as the main execution site in the state, some executions were carried out at various country locations until 1900. In 1886 the Fremantle Prison was handed over to the colonial government as the colony's major prison; from 1889 43 men and one woman (Martha Rendell) were hanged there.

The first execution under British law was that of Midgegooroo, who on 22 May 1833 was executed by firing squad while bound to the door of the original Perth Gaol. John Gavin, a Parkhurst apprentice, was the first British settler to be executed in Western Australia. In 1844 he was hanged for murder at the Fremantle Round House, at the age of fifteen. Bridget Larkin was the first woman to be executed in Western Australia, for the murder of John Hurford, in 1855. "It is the sentence of this court that you be returned to your former custody, and at a time and place appointed by the Governor-in-Council, that you be hanged by the neck till you are dead, and may the Lord have mercy on your soul". The last execution was that of Eric Edgar Cooke on 26 October 1964 at Fremantle Prison. Cooke had been convicted on one count of murder, but evidence and his confessions suggested he had committed many more. The last sentence of death in Western Australia was passed in 1984, but the female killer (Brenda Hodge) in question had her sentence commuted to imprisonment for life, as was customary by this stage.

Capital punishment was formally removed from the statutes of the state with the passage of the Acts Amendment (Abolition of Capital Punishment) Act 1984. The Legislative Assembly voted 24 to 20 votes, the Legislative Council voted 17 to 12.

== Former territories under Australian administration ==
=== Nauru ===
The Australian administration of Nauru as a League of Nations mandate applied the criminal code of Queensland as at 1 July 1921, which allowed for capital punishment. It remained in place until Nauru's independence in 1968.

=== Papua New Guinea ===
The Territory of Papua adopted the Queensland criminal code in 1902, which allowed for the death penalty. Following the Australian occupation of German New Guinea, the Queensland criminal code was also adopted for the Territory of New Guinea in 1921.

Papua administrator Hubert Murray wrote to Prime Minister James Scullin in 1930 emphasising the need for retention of the death penalty, stating:

In Papua the position of the European is that of a small garrison, upholding the cause of civilization among a more or less hostile or indifferent population of primitives; and obviously the lives of this small garrison and the honour of the women must be protected. And we believe that the only adequate protection is death. A failure to afford an adequate protection would jeopardise the cause of civilization, and might bring about the horrors of a racial war.

Executions were carried out infrequently in Papua, with none from 1916 to 1930 and two in the 1930s. They were more frequent in New Guinea, where "Australian administrators struggled to control the villages".

The last execution under the Australian administration of Papua New Guinea took place in Lae in November 1957, when Aro was hanged for the murder of his two wives. Death remained the mandatory sentence for wilful murder until 1965, when it was abolished by the Papua New Guinea House of Assembly.

==== Public executions ====
In 1907, the Deakin government approved an amendment to the Queensland criminal code as applied in Papua, to allow for the resumption of public executions.

Public executions were seen as a "tool of government" in the Territory of New Guinea. In 1933, a district officer reported that two executions in New Britain had been carried out before crowds of nearly 1,000 people, and that "execution of the murderers on the spot has done much to make these natives fall in with the wishes of the government".

During World War II, following the Japanese occupation of New Guinea, executions of civilians convicted of collaboration with the Japanese were carried out by the Australian New Guinea Administrative Unit (ANGAU), following a series of trials by ANGAU officer Dickie Humphries. The ANGAU was controlled by the Australian military but was charged with carrying out the civilian administration of the territory. At least 22 civilians were publicly executed in New Guinea in 1943 and 1944, with the death sentences approved by Australian commander Edmund Herring.

== Public opinion ==
In Australia, capital punishment was banned on a state-by-state basis through the 20th century. Despite the ban, polls have indicated varying support for the reintroduction of the practice. After the (wrongful) conviction of Lindy Chamberlain for murdering her baby Azaria there was a surge in demands that she be hanged. The overturning of her conviction caused a short-lived drop in support for the death penalty. A 2005 Bulletin poll showed that most Australians supported capital punishment. The Australian National University's 2007 Electoral Survey found that 44 per cent of people thought the death penalty should be reintroduced, while only 38 per cent disagreed. In the 2002 case of the Bali bombers, then prime minister John Howard stated that Australians expected their execution by Indonesia.

On occasion the issue of capital punishment is published in the media or is subject to media and public support and scrutiny. Most occasions where capital punishment is brought up in the media, it is regarding current cases of intense media coverage regarding murder, rape and in extreme circumstances such as terrorism. On various occasions, the media and public express support for capital punishment for the most heinous of crimes including mass murder such as in the cases of the Milat Backpacker Murders and the Bryant Port Arthur massacre, in which a total of 35 people were killed stirring strong emotions as to whether or not to reintroduce the death penalty. However, no person of significant stature or influence has advocated the death penalty for quite some time since the last execution in 1967.

In 2009 a public opinion survey was conducted by Roy Morgan Research where responders were given the question: "In your opinion, should the penalty for murder be death or imprisonment?" The surveyors conducted the poll for people from 14 and onwards in age with around 687 people completing the survey for publication. The results of the poll are as follows:

Date	Death penalty %	Imprisonment %	Undecided %
December 1947	67	24	9
February 1953	68	24	8
April 1962	53	37	10
November 1975	40	43	17
October 1980	43	40	17
January 1986	43	41	16
July 1986	44	40	16
July 1987	49	37	14
February 1989	52	34	14
February 1990	53	35	12
June 1990	51	35	14
May 1992	46	39	15
May. 1993	54	36	10
August 1995	53	36	11
November 2005	27	66	7
December 2005	25	69	6
August 2009	23	64	13

In 2014 another public opinion survey was conducted by Roy Morgan Research where responders were given the question: "If a person is convicted of a terrorist act in Australia which kills someone should the penalty be death?" The surveyors conducted the poll with a cross-section of 1,307 Australians. The poll showed a small majority of Australians (52.5%) favoured the death penalty for deadly terrorist acts in Australia while 47.5% did not.

== See also ==
- Punishment in Australia

== General and cited references ==
- Death Penalty Abolition Act 1973
- Capital Punishment from the Fremantle Prison site
- Trends & Issues in Crime and Criminal Justice No. 3: Capital punishment from the Australian Institute of Criminology
- Dhakiyarr Wirrpanda – Appeal for Justice
- "Capital Punishment" speech by The Ian Callinan, Justice of the High Court of Australia
- The History of Correctional Services in South Australia
- Finnane, Mark (2022). "'Upholding the Cause of Civilization': The Australian Death Penalty in War and Colonialism". International Journal for Crime, Justice and Social Democracy. 11 (3): 23–32. doi:10.5204/ijcjsd.2473. hdl:10072/418380.
- Lennan, Jo; Williams, George (2012). "The Death Penalty in Australian Law". Sydney Law Review. 34: 659–694.
