= Brenda Hodge =

Australian convicted murderer (born 1951)

Brenda Hodge (born 1951) is an Australian who is notable as the last person to be sentenced to death in Australia. She was found guilty of murdering her de facto partner in 1984 and was sentenced to death. Her sentence was commuted to life imprisonment and she was paroled in 1995.

== Early life ==
Brenda was born Dorothy Brenda White in Victoria in 1951 to Beryl Nanette MacKenzie. Her childhood was unhappy. She was frequently the victim of beatings by her alcoholic mother. Her brother Danny constantly bullied her and she grew up with many of her mother's partners. Brenda says she was raped when she was as young as four, by a babysitter who would continue raping her for nine more years. As a child she began skipping school.

In 1965, her mother left her stepfather and brother, Edd, and took her to live in Carlton. Brenda got a job, but her mother began spending most of the money on alcohol. Brenda took a job working on a farm, where she was happy at first, but left due to a dispute with the owner.

One night her mother sent her off with one of her male friends to the pub. After taking her to a park, he raped her, telling her that her mother had allowed him to have sex with her in exchange for alcohol money. After being sent to court, she was charged with being a 'neglected child' and placed into a reformatory in Melbourne.

After escaping, she was sent between mental hospitals and reformatories, until her biological father contacted her, inviting her to live with him in Brisbane. She later found out he was an alcoholic too and he pressured her into having sex with him. Soon after she ran away and was put into a mental hospital. She was eventually released into a charity worker's care. She started working in various places throughout Queensland, moving to Darwin and eventually, Western Australia. Brenda married a man named David Hodge in 1972, divorcing in 1977.

She became involved with a police officer, Peter Rafferty, while working in Leonora in 1983.

== The murder ==
On the day of the murder, Brenda was packing her belongings to leave. Peter began taunting her and yelling. In her book, she states her memory of the incident is blurred, and only remembering aiming the gun at him and firing. She states she does not know what was on her mind nor why she did it and that there are moments of blackness in her memory. After being shot, Peter retreated to the shed, where Brenda followed, shooting him twice more, killing him.

After the incident, Hodge stopped at a deli and ordered a Coke. She went to a hotel and confessed the murder to a friend, who did not believe her. She later went to a lookout where she considered suicide. Eventually, Hodge decided to turn herself in. She went to Kalgoorlie police station, where she confessed to the murder.

== Sentencing ==
In August 1984, she was found guilty of wilful murder and was sentenced to death by Justice Pidgeon. On being sentenced to hang she recalls "(I felt)... Numb, detached. I felt nothing. I believe I am not the only person to have had that experience. Many people thought Lindy Chamberlain was guilty simply because she 'showed no emotion' at her trial."

After the state of Western Australia abolished capital punishment, Hodge's sentence was commuted to life in prison. She recalls, "It didn't mean anything to me at the time; I still had this vague idea my life was already over, almost as though I was already dead..."

She was sent to Bandyup maximum security prison where she remained until 1988, when she was transferred to Greenough Regional Prison. In prison she began to study. She learnt to touch type and enrolled in English and literature courses as well as a TAFE trade apprenticeship in cooking. Becoming a model prisoner, she became friendly with a parish priest and converted to Roman Catholicism while imprisoned.

After numerous appeals, she was paroled on 20 October 1995. She was contacted by her half-sisters in 2003 for the first time ever, not knowing she had any more family. She still keeps in close contact with them to this day.

She currently lives in Geraldton, Western Australia. Her autobiography, WALK ON: The remarkable true story of the last person sentenced to death in Australia was published in 2005. She appeared on Enough Rope with Andrew Denton in 2005 talking about her life for the first time in public.

Shortly after Hodge's sentence, Western Australia became the last state to remove the death penalty for murder. New South Wales, however, retained it for treason until the following year.
