= Robert David Bennett =

Australian rapist

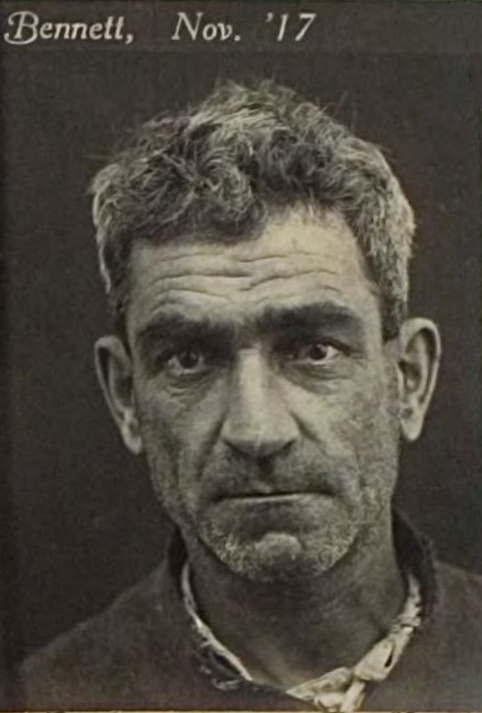
- Bennett in November 1917
- Born: 12 September 1875; Hutchesontown, Glasgow, Scotland
- Died: 26 September 1932 (aged 57); HM Prison Pentridge, Coburg, Victoria, Australia
- Cause of death: Execution by hanging
- Other names: Robert Bennett, David Bennett
- Occupations: Carpenter, painter
- Status: Executed
- Convictions: Child rape (2 counts); Armed robbery Conspiracy to defraud
- Penalty: Death

Robert David Bennett (12 September 1875 – 26 September 1932) was an Australian habitual criminal and sex offender. He was convicted of the rape of a young girl in Western Australia in 1911 and, despite receiving a life sentence for the crime, he was released in June 1914 under controversial circumstances. Bennett and another criminal named Angus Murray committed a series of offences in New South Wales and Victoria, culminating in an armed bank robbery in suburban Melbourne in 1917, for which each were sentenced to fifteen years in prison. Soon after his release from prison Bennett was again convicted of raping a young girl, a capital offence for which he received a death sentence. He was executed at Pentridge Prison in September 1932. Bennett was the first of eleven people to be hanged at Pentridge Prison after the closure of Melbourne Gaol in 1924.

Bennett was the last person to be executed in Australia for rape or for any crime other than murder.

== Biography ==
=== Early life ===
Robert David Bennett was born on 12 September 1875 at Hutchesontown in inner-city Glasgow, Scotland, the eldest child of David Bennett and Jane (née Borland). His father was a carpenter by profession.

Bennett and his family emigrated to Australia aboard the Energia, arriving at Sydney on 4 June 1886.

=== Move to Midland Junction ===
Robert Bennett and Elizabeth Steele were married in 1897 at Fremantle, Western Australia. The couple had a daughter, Margaret, born in 1898 at Fremantle.

By 1905 Bennett and his family were living in the Midland Junction district near Perth, where Bennett worked as a painter. He was the senior trainer of the Midland Junction Football Club in 1906 and 1907. Bennett was also "well known in boxing circles" and managed local boxing matches at Midland Junction.

=== Outrages at Midland ===
When Bennett was convicted of the sexual assault of a 10-year-old girl in March 1911, and following his controversial release from prison in June 1914, several instances of sexual assaults that preceded his 1911 conviction were reported in the press. It was stated that "there was strong presumption that he was guilty of tampering with little children on more than two or three other occasions" in the Midland Junction district. After Bennett's committal hearing the Midland Junction newspaper, The Swan Express, reported that "the present offence, the one committed three months ago, and a similar crime perpetrated about three years ago, all occurred within 100 yards of the Town Hall". After a series of cases of interference with little children had occurred at Midland "the name of Bennett was so freely coupled with the outrages that to a large extent he was ostracised by his shop mates".

- One case involving a young girl was considered to have been "far worse" than the case for which he was convicted in 1911. In June 1910, as reported in The Swan Express, "a little girl nine years of age was attacked by a male fiend and abominably maltreated". The girl and her brother were passing through the grounds attached to the Church of the Ascension (near Midland Town Hall), "when a man approached and sent the boy away for some lollies". During his absence "the girl was savagely attacked by the miscreant". The police were unable to collect sufficient evidence to justify an arrest, but it was reported that it was "the settled conviction of the police that the inhuman perpetrator of the deed is a local resident". Statements in connection with the case were submitted to the authorities, but as the only witness against the perpetrator was child herself, the Crown Prosecutor decided it "would be useless to arrest Bennett, as, there being no corroboration, the jury could not possibly convict."
- Subsequent to above case, Bennett was caught trying to entice a child "away into a secluded spot" by the child's father. The father "gave Bennett a sound thrashing", and ordered him to leave Midland Junction. Bennett left for a brief period, but returned soon afterwards "to commit the revolting offence for which he was arrested."

=== Sexual assault of a minor ===
On the evening of Saturday, 28 January 1911, Bennett was observed to accost a young girl, aged 10 years, in the vicinity of the Town Hall at Midland Junction. His actions were witnessed by Walter Hodges, the local postmaster, whose bedroom overlooked the Town Hall. As the child was passing Bennett called out to her, "Come in here, dear, and I'll give you sixpence". The child took no notice and continued on her way. Later, as she was returning home past the Town Hall, Bennett called out to her again. This time she stopped; he took her by the hand and, resting his other hand on her shoulder, led her in the direction of the lavatory in the church reserve near the Midland Town Hall. Seeing this occur, the postmaster immediately telephoned the nearby police station and Constable Walker hastened to attend. When he reached the reserve, Walker jumped the fence; as he approached the lavatory he heard the child "making a sound between a cry and a moan", followed by a man's voice saying, "Shut up, or I'll shoot you". The policeman pushed against the door but was only able to open it a little way. However, he saw enough to leave little doubt that the man "was trying to ravish" the young girl. Walker called out, "Get up, you dog", and pushed with renewed force against the door. Eventually he succeeded in gaining entry to the lavatory "and saw that Bennett was fully exposed". When the policeman seized hold of Bennett, he pleaded for mercy and asked "to be allowed to adjust his clothing", but Walker refused to allow it. During the scuffle the young girl ran away. Walker took Bennett to the gateway where he asked a passer-by to note his prisoner's undressed condition.

Later that evening a doctor examined the young girl and "found signs of interference". The doctor claimed the child was "mentally weak, and it was doubtful if she was in a mental state to distinguish right from wrong". Despite the medical assessment the young girl later gave evidence at Bennett's trial. A newspaper report of the trial noted that "the child is undoubtably afflicted mentally, but nevertheless she gave her evidence very well", adding that "even those used to daily attending courts of law, could hardly repress a shudder as the girl told her story in her simple way".

Bennett was tried on 14 and 15 March 1911 at the Criminal Sessions, charged with having had unlawful carnal knowledge of a girl under the age of 13 years. After the witnesses for the prosecution gave their evidence, Bennett took the stand. He stated he was a painter and in about 1898 he had a serious accident when a block of wood fell on his head. Subsequently, he underwent seven separate operations "for various bodily troubles". On the day of the offense he claimed to have "taken a quantity of drink" and could not remember what he had done. A doctor giving evidence for the defence stated he had examined the accused and concluded Bennett was insane "due to a thickening of the skull, contributing causes being the large number of operations performed upon him". The judge, in summing up, gave special instructions to the jury on how to regard the evidence regarding the defence of insanity. After retiring for twenty minutes the jury returned a verdict of guilty "on the full count". Bennett was remanded until later in the week for sentencing.

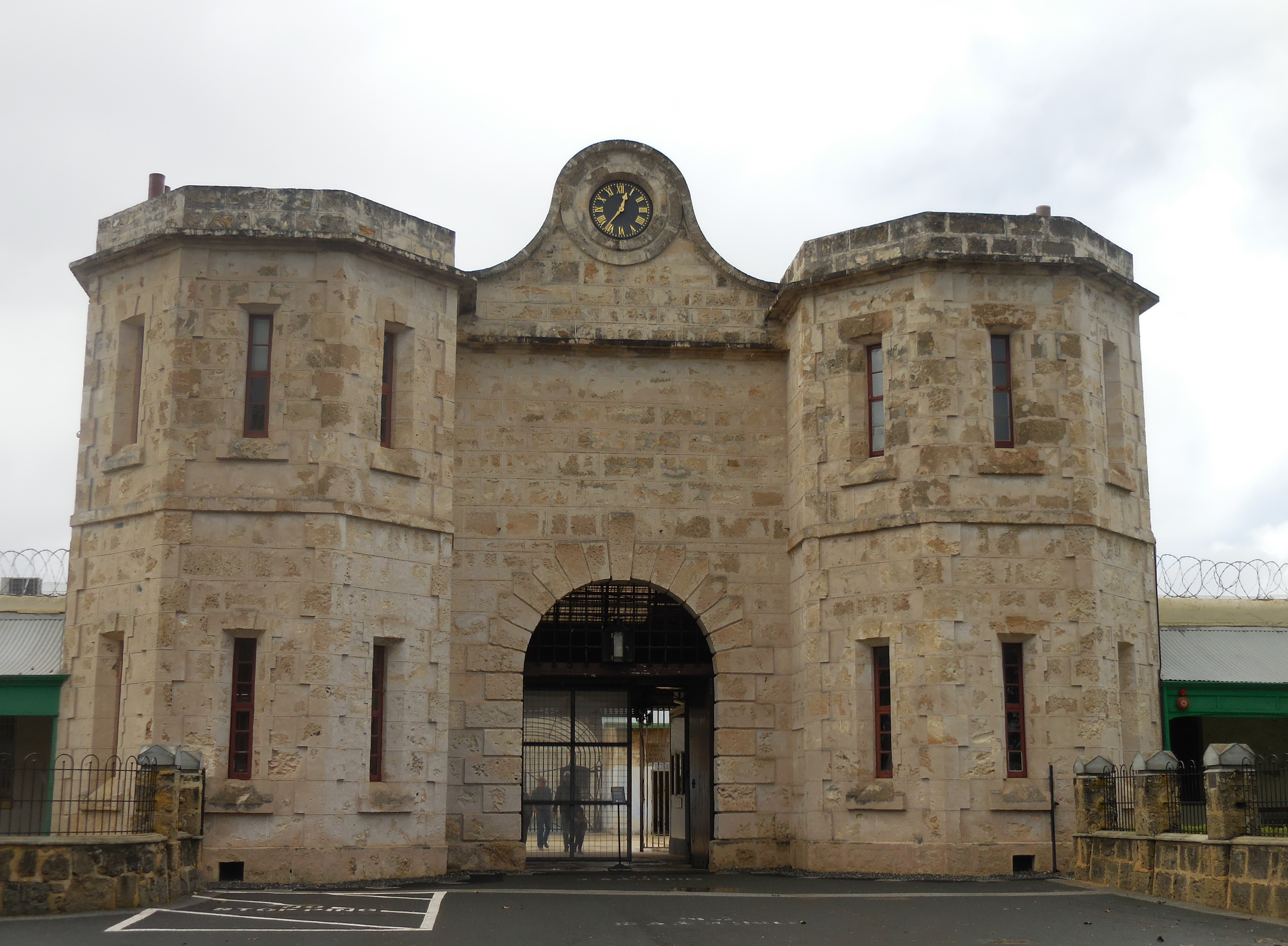
The gatehouse of Fremantle Gaol.

Bennett was sentenced on March 17. In passing sentence the judge, Justice Robert McMillan, commented that the prisoner was "guilty of a horrible offence" and was "not a person who ought to be at large". He passed "the maximum punishment possible", that of imprisonment for life with hard labour. Justice McMillan then added that he was required by law to pass a further punishment under a recent Act of Parliament called the Criminal Code Amendment Act. Bennett had committed an offence under section 185 of the Criminal Code for which the Act required the judge to pass an additional sentence of whipping. Justice McMillan described this as "a repulsive obligation" as he was sure a flogging would tend to increase Bennett's "mental infirmity". However, the law allowed the judge to use his discretion. McMillan had looked through the records for the past 10 years and nine strokes of the cat-o'-nine-tails had been the minimum sentence he could find, so the judge directed that in this case the number of strokes should be limited to nine. Bennett listened to the sentencing in silence, "and at the close of his Honour's address had to be assisted out of the dock".

In 1913 Elizabeth and Robert Bennett were divorced. It was disclosed in a later newspaper report that "Bennett's wife sued him for divorce on the ground of his adultery" with the young girl he had sexually assaulted in January 1911, "and relied on practically the same evidence submitted at the criminal trial".

While he was imprisoned in Fremantle Gaol, Bennett met another prisoner named Henry James Donnelly (alias Angus Murray), with whom he was to maintain a close relationship in the years ahead. Donnelly had been convicted in Perth in April 1909 on a burglary charge, receiving a sentence of seven years' hard labour. Donnelly was discharged from prison in February 1914. Within four months Bennett was also released from prison.

=== Controversial release ===
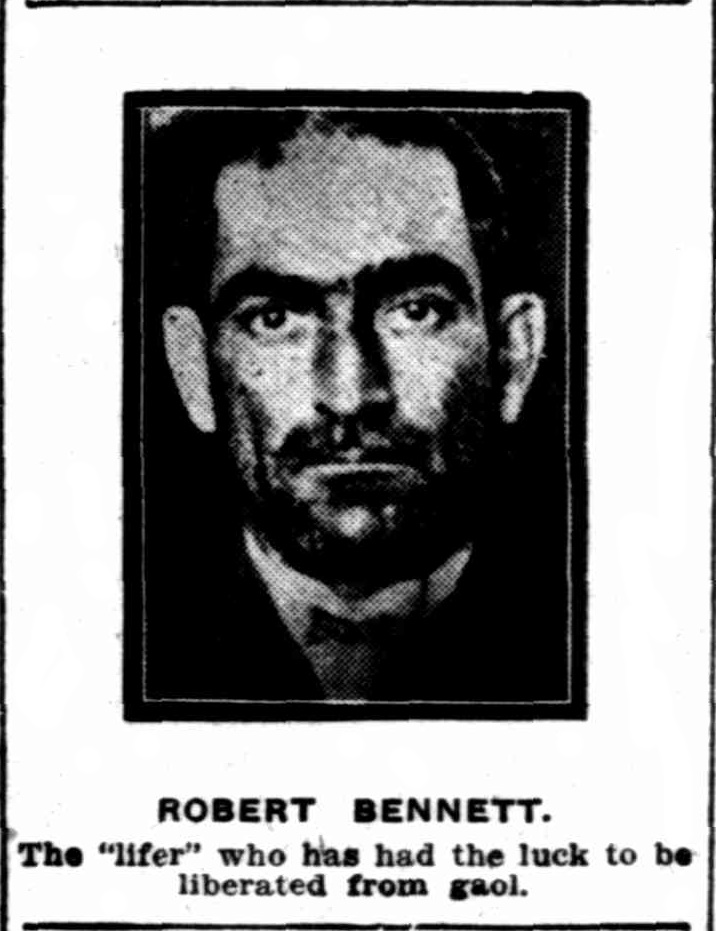
Illustration from the article revealing details of Bennett's early release from prison (in Perth's Sunday Times newspaper, 5 July 1914).

Despite his life sentence Bennett served just under three years and three months of imprisonment. He was released from prison in June 1914 under the authorisation of Thomas Walker, the Attorney-General of Western Australia in the Scadden Labor government. In justifying his decision Walker claimed to have received petitions "from various solicitors, who advanced medical reasons for Bennett's release", but what had "weighed with him most" was a petition sent by 'Major' Alfred Head, the Men's Social Secretary of the Salvation Army in Western Australia, on 27 April 1914. Head had submitted a proposal suggested to him by 'Colonel' Hoskins, head of the social work branch of the Salvation Army, that upon his release Bennett could be sent to Melbourne where Hoskins "would receive him and find him employment where he would be right away from temptation". In a statement made on the gallows prior to his execution in 1932, Bennett attributed his release in 1914 to representations made about his case by a "well-known Perth barrister" named Arthur Haynes.

When Bennett was released on 9 June 1914 he was met at Fremantle Gaol by Major Head, who put him "on a boat bound for Melbourne, where Colonel Hoskins had promised to meet him on arrival". The newspaper report in Perth's Sunday Times, which disclosed the details of Bennett's release, was scornful of the actions of the Attorney-General. Referring to Walker as "tender-hearted Tommy", the report suggested he had been "led by the nose by the Salvation Army, and the Army will do itself no good by interfering with justice in this manner". The writer also expressed concerns about "saddling Victoria with a sexual maniac of such dangerous tendencies as Robert Bennett" and cast doubt on the capacity of the Salvation Army to keep Bennett under constant surveillance. The report concluded: "We do not allow lunatics from the Eastern States to be landed here, but ship them back, and under those circumstances we cannot expect our Eastern sisters to be more lamblike and admit our moral refuse in the shape of a dangerous sexual maniac like the ex-painter of Midland Junction". When interviewed in Melbourne after his release, Bennett expressed himself as being "very favorably impressed" with the Salvation Army "and the work it was doing for him". He added, "I am anxious to become a good citizen, and am thankful for the chance which has been given to me".

When a representative of Midland Junction's local newspaper, The Swan Express, phoned Major Head on July 15, in an effort "to obtain some insight into the reasons which had been advanced by the Salvation Army authorities to secure the release of the notorious Robert Bennett", the response from the Major was less than co-operative, with Head's manner described as "belligerent". Nevertheless, the full transcript of the conversation was published in the local paper. On Monday, 27 July 1914, an "indignation meeting" regarding the premature release of Bennett from gaol was held in the Midland Junction Town Hall. The meeting was described as being "largely attended" and strikingly unanimous". A resolution was passed at the meeting protesting against the action of the Attorney-General in releasing Bennett from prison, despite being imprisoned for life "by a Supreme Court Judge for a crime which His Honor characterised as the most horrible and disgusting which had ever come before him".

The Opposition Liberal Party attempted to make political capital out of the controversy surrounding Bennett's release from custody. The Leader of the Opposition, Frank Wilson, moved a motion on July 29 in an attempt to censure Walker. The motion read: "That in the opinion of this House the advice tendered by the Attorney-General to his Excellency the Governor, which resulted in the liberation of Robert Bennett, was not in the best interests of the administration of justice, and is calculated to weaken the protection afforded to women and children under our laws; and, further, that the Attorney-General is deserving of censure for having tendered such advice". After a lengthy debate the motion was defeated.

=== Fraud charges ===
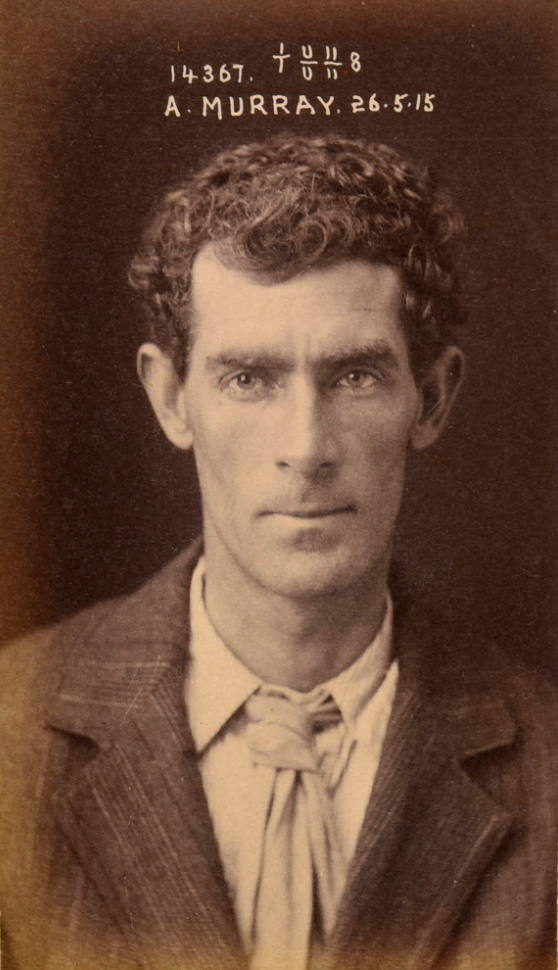
Angus Murray photographed in May 1915.

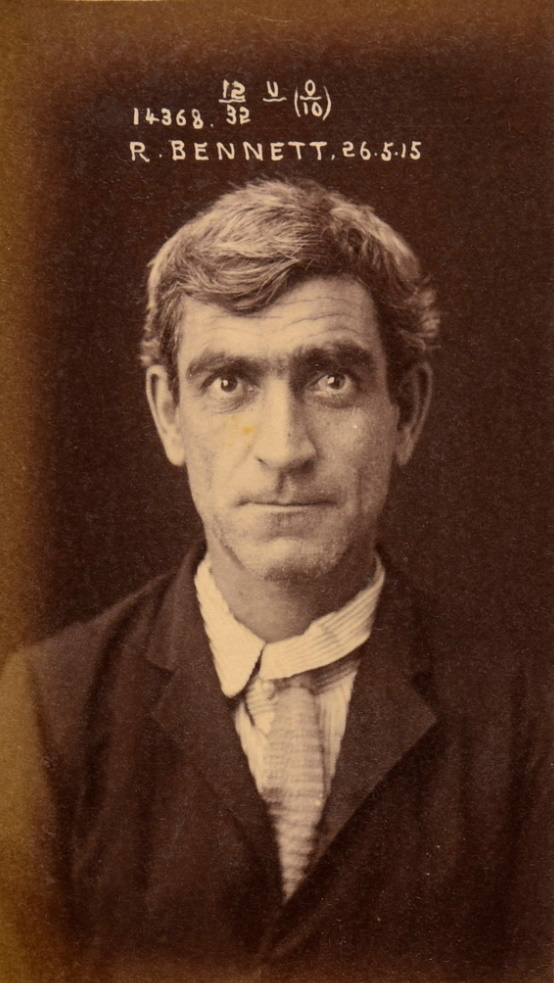
Robert Bennett photographed in May 1915.

In December 1914 a man named Frank Dalton, the chief steward of the steamer Alinga, made the acquaintance of Bennett and Angus Murray who were able to induce him to invest £300 in a proposed vaudeville theatre at Manly. The money was deposited in a bank in Sydney, and shortly afterwards the two men disappeared, together with the money. In February 1915 detectives arrested Bennett and Murray in Melbourne and charged them "with having conspired to defraud Dalton of the money". Murray and Bennett were tried in the Central Criminal Court in Sydney on May 25 and found guilty of conspiracy to defraud Dalton. Bennett was sentenced to twelve months' hard labour and Murray sentenced to two years' hard labour, but an appeal was lodged against their convictions the next day.

The appeal was heard in the Court of Criminal Appeal on August 13. The main basis of the appeal was that the Crown Prosecutor had commented during the May trial on the fact that Murray had chosen not to give evidence on oath on his own behalf. The appeal was successful; the convictions were quashed and a new trial was ordered.

In early 1915, prior to their arrest in February, Bennett and Murray had undertaken another scheme to obtain money by fraudulent means. The two men had purchased a piano from Barrett and Co. for £45. Some time afterwards they reported to the firm that the receipt for the transaction had been lost and a duplicate was provided to them. Several days later Bennett and Murray borrowed £20 from a money-lender, giving the bill of sale of the piano and a joint promissory note as security. Soon afterwards they fraudulently resold the piano to Barrett for £30. When Bennett and Murray successfully appealed against their conviction for the Dalton fraud charge, they were further remanded in custody to face the Barrett fraud charge and a re-trial of the Dalton charge.

The two men were tried on the Barrett fraud charge on 23 September 1915 in the Sydney Quarter Sessions. The jury convicted both accused men; Murray was sentenced to six months' imprisonment and Bennett to three months, both sentences with hard labour to be served in Bathurst Gaol. On 2 December 1915 Bennett and Murray were re-tried for the Dalton fraud charge in the Central Criminal Court. They were found guilty of conspiracy to defraud and were sentenced to further imprisonment terms, with hard labour, of nine months (Bennett) and two years (Murray).

=== Armed robbery ===
On 18 September 1917 Murray and Bennett carried out what was described as "one of the most audacious bank robberies that have been committed in Melbourne for some years". At three o'clock in the afternoon Murray entered the Middle Park branch of the English, Scottish, and Australian Bank, located in Canterbury-road opposite the railway station. The bank was empty apart from the teller, Harold Brooke, who was "making up his cash, and was completing entries in the ledgers". Murray entered the bank and closed and locked the front door, walked up to the counter and pointed a Winchester rifle at Brooke's head. The teller was ordered to the public side of the counter and Murray bound and gagged him with calico strips. With the teller immobilised Murray filled a bag with cash from the till and the open safe. When a clerk from another nearby bank knocked on the door, Murray hurriedly left by the back door. He climbed the fence to a lane at the back of the bank where Bennett was waiting in a rubber-tyred horse-drawn jinker cart. Witnesses saw the two men depart from the scene in the cart, heading in the direction of St. Kilda. It was later determined that £541 in notes and silver were stolen from the bank.

Following the robbery descriptions were distributed to Victorian police and a close watch was maintained at the metropolitan railway stations. Police later concluded that Bennett and Murray managed to leave Melbourne by horse and cart, stolen from South Melbourne the night of the robbery. The two bank robbers then caught a mail train from a country station to Wodonga, arriving there at about midday on September 19. At Wodonga they engaged a car and driver to take them across the Murray River to Albury. They spent some time at the Globe Hotel before deciding to send a package of banknotes from the robbery to Sydney by registered post. In the meantime, the police at Albury had been advised of the robbery and were on the lookout for strangers and suspicious activity. The local police saw two men near the Globe Hotel who attracted their attention due to their "furtive movements". One of the men was known to Constable Cleaver "as a well-known criminal". Police watched the men's movements as they "went into the hotel and moved about the street". Bennett was observed to enter the post-office in Dean-street carrying a small parcel and was followed into the building by Constable Cleaver. After he handed the parcel to the postmaster the constable apprehended Bennett and intercepted the parcel, which was found to be addressed to a woman residing in North Sydney. The parcel contained about £380, which included a number of five pound notes with identical serial numbers to those stolen from the Middle Park bank. Murray was also apprehended and both men taken to the police station for questioning. The physical descriptions of the two men when they were arrested were: "Bennett is a short, nuggety, dark and very strongly built man" and "Murray is very tall and thin". Both men were formally charged at the Albury Police Court the next morning. Victorian warrants issued for the arrest of the accused men were produced in court and the Police Magistrate ordered the two men to be returned to Melbourne. That afternoon Bennett and Murray, under police escort, were taken to Melbourne by the mail train. On October 3 at South Melbourne the two men were committed for trial for the Middle Park bank robbery.

Bennett and Murray were tried before Justice Hood in the Criminal Court over three days, on 25, 26 and 29 October 1917. They each pleaded not guilty and were undefended, "but each, at times, cross-examined witnesses". After retiring for half an hour the jury returned guilty verdicts. Justice Hood stated that "he looked upon the two men as a pair of very dangerous professional criminals" and considered it his duty to "lock both men up for as long as he could". He explained that he was unable to declare the men "habitual criminals", as that section of the Act only applied to persons previously convicted in Victorian courts, but he proposed arriving at the same result by applying another section of legislation, "namely, by directing that they be detained in a reformatory during the Governor's pleasure". He then sentenced both Bennett and Murray to "the full penalty" of fifteen years' imprisonment, with the aforesaid possible extension of detainment after that period.

=== Murray's fate ===
On 24 August 1923 Angus Murray escaped from Geelong Gaol. On the morning of October 8 outside of the Glenferrie railway station, Murray and an accomplice named Richard Buckley robbed Thomas Berriman, the manager of the Hawthorn branch of the Commercial Bank, who was carrying a case of banknotes. Berriman resisted the robbery and was shot in the chest by Buckley, severely wounding the bank manager (who later died). On October 11 police made a pre-dawn raid on a house in St. Kilda occupied by Squizzy Taylor and Ida Pender, where they found Murray hiding out. Murray was charged with the Glenferrie robbery and Taylor and Pender were held for several weeks on various charges related to harbouring Murray and occupying a house "frequented by reputed thieves". After Berriman died on October 21 Murray was charged with his murder "in company with some man, to the Attorney-General unknown". Murray was convicted and sentenced to death for the crime. His sentence was the subject of intense public and political scrutiny and several judicial appeals, but eventually on 14 April 1924 he was hanged at Melbourne Gaol (the last execution before it was closed later that year).

=== Capital offence ===
By June 1932 Bennett had been released from prison and was living at North Carlton, working as a painter and builder and using the name David Bennett. He was employed to carry out renovations to an empty house at the north end of Drummond-street, Carlton. On Sunday afternoon, 3 July 1932, a girl aged four years and her brother had attended Sunday school at the Methodist Church in Drummond-street. After the classes had ended a witness named William Heuston saw the girl and her brother walking along Drummond-street and he also noticed a man, later identified as David Bennett, standing in the street. Shortly afterwards the witness saw Bennett walking with the girl. Bennett had enticed the girl away "on a pretext that he would buy her sweets". Bennett and the girl were seen to enter a house in Drummond-street with a "To Let" sign on the front window (the same house in which Bennett had been carrying out repairs). Later Heuston met the boy, who was "obviously distressed, and said he was looking for his sister". Heuston then went to the Sunday school for assistance, and he and a group of teachers (a man and two women), went to the unoccupied house. As they were hammering on the door, Bennett pushed the child out the back door of the house into a side lane and returned to open the front door. He denied there was a girl in the house and as the group pushed past him, Bennett left by the front door, slamming the door behind him, and ran out into the street. The teachers and Heuston then pursued and overtook him. During the struggle a plainclothes constable arrived and Bennett was apprehended and taken to the Carlton police station where he "protested his innocence". Meanwhile, the boy had run home to tell his mother of his missing sister; as the mother was hurrying to the scene she saw her daughter "emerge from a lane" with her face and hands covered in blood and her clothing torn. The girl was later examined by a doctor at her home and subsequently admitted to the Children's Hospital "in a serious condition", it having been determined she "had been shamefully maltreated and outraged in a fiendish manner".

Bennett was charged "with a capital offence against a four-year-old girl" and tried in the Criminal Court over two days on 15 and 16 August 1932, presided over by Justice Wasley. The jury returned a verdict of guilty and the judge pronounced a sentence of death, at which "Bennett collapsed, and had to be assisted from the dock."

Bennett lodged an appeal against the conviction, which was heard on Monday, September 5. A bench of three judges dismissed the grounds for appeal and concluded "that there was ample evidence to warrant a conviction".

=== Execution ===
David Bennett (alias Robert Bennett) was hanged in Pentridge Gaol at Coburg on 26 September 1932, aged 57 years.

Before the execution was carried out Bennett was asked whether he had anything to say. He responded by giving a lengthy and detailed statement lasting over seven minutes, which covered aspects of his trial and appeal, as well as details about his conviction and release in Western Australia twenty years earlier. Speaking in a "calm, unemotional manner" he claimed "he had never done anything to deserve the extreme penalty" and that his hanging was to "appease a vengeful public."

When the sentence was carried out Bennett's death was instantaneous. His execution was the first to be carried out at Pentridge Prison after the closure of Melbourne Gaol in 1924.

== See also ==
- Capital punishment in Australia
- Ronald Wolfe (rapist), an American habitual criminal and sex offender who became the last person to be executed for rape in the United States
