= Angus Murray =

Australian criminal

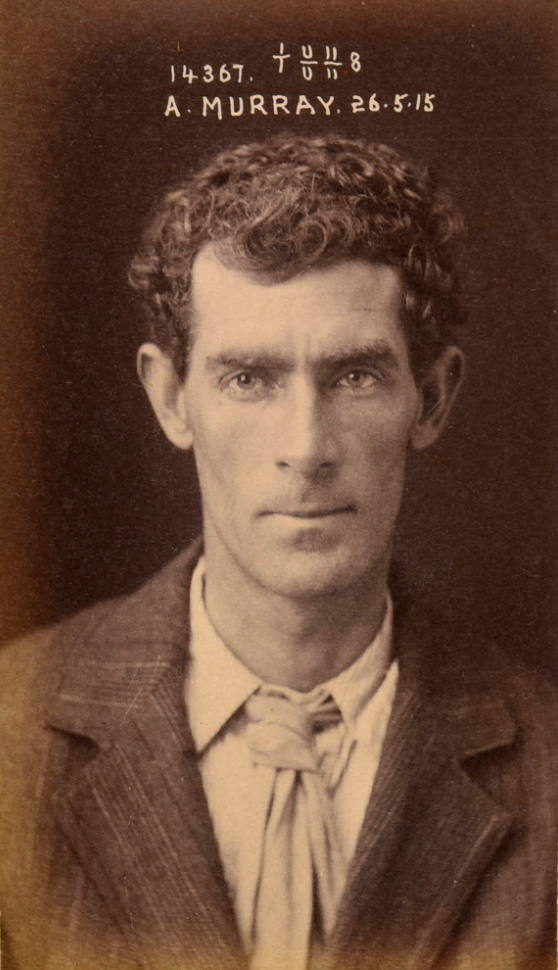
- Mugshot of Angus Murray, 1915
- Born: Henry James Donnelly; 16 December 1881; Stepney, Adelaide, South Australia
- Died: 14 April 1924 (aged 42); Old Melbourne Gaol, Victoria, Australia
- Other names: Henry James Donnelly, James Reid, James Read
- Occupation: Criminal
- Known for: Last person executed at Old Melbourne Gaol; association with Squizzy Taylor
- Status: Executed by hanging
- Convictions: Armed robbery, accomplice to murder, theft, fraud
- Penalty: Death
- Accomplices: Robert David Bennett, Squizzy Taylor, Richard Buckley, Charles Francis Donnelly

Angus Murray (born Henry James Donnelly; 16 December 1881 – 14 April 1924) was an Australian criminal and associate of Melbourne gangster Squizzy Taylor. He was the last person executed at Melbourne Gaol, following his conviction for armed robbery and for being an accomplice to the murder of bank manager Thomas Berriman during a 1923 robbery in Glenferrie, Victoria. His execution was controversial, drawing widespread public protest. Murray was portrayed in multiple Australian films and television series, including Underbelly: Squizzy.

== Biography ==
Angus Murray was born as Henry James Donnelly on 16 December 1881 in Stepney, Adelaide, South Australia. He was the son of Henry James Donnelly and Sarah Ann Reid.

Murray's paternal grandmother was Mary Calnan, an Irish convict transported to Tasmania on the East London in 1843 with 133 other women. His paternal grandfather was William Donnelly, another convict who was transported to Tasmania on Eden in 1836.

Murray's sister was Elizabeth Mary Donnelly (born 1891), the wife of George E. Metcalf. She and her husband were well known for the missionary work they undertook in China, where they first met. Her name appears as next of kin for her brother, Charles Francis Donnelly, in his World War I records and Charles is known to have been an early accomplice of his brother, then named Henry James Donnelly.

== Criminal career ==
=== Early robberies in Adelaide ===
Murray is first known to have been charged with criminal offences in September 1901, when he and his younger brother Charles Francis Donnelly were charged with breaking and entering, along with multiple robberies around Adelaide, South Australia. The brothers were sentenced to 18 months in prison.

The brothers were again arrested and charged in July 1903 for a spate of robberies around Adelaide, which involved stealing jewellery, including from the home of Sir Samuel Way, Chief Justice of South Australia. At trial the jury were unable to agree about Murray's guilt, but his younger brother Charles was found guilty and sentenced to 10 years.

=== Perth jewellery robbery ===
In 1909 Angus Murray was arrested and charged under the name Henry James Donnelly for a series of robberies and theft of around £600 of jewellery in Perth, Western Australia. He initially gave the alias James Reid when he was arrested and later stated that Reid was his mother's name. Murray and his accomplice William Griffin were found guilty and sentenced to 7 years.

=== Fraud charges in New South Wales ===
In New South Wales in 1915, Murray was arrested with Robert David Bennett and both were charged with fraud. In the New South Wales Police Gazette the charges were outlined with Angus Murray being noted as using the aliases Henry James Donnelly and Reid or Read. Angus Murray was found guilty of fraud offences and sentenced to 2 years in prison.

=== Armed robbery in Melbourne ===
In 1917 a bank in Middle Park, Melbourne, Victoria was robbed by two armed men, with a teller being bound and gagged during the robbery. This robbery was described in the press as "one of the most audacious bank robberies that has been committed in Melbourne for some years". £541 was stolen from the bank in notes and coins.

Angus Murray and Robert Bennett were arrested in Albury a few days later and charged with armed robbery. They were sent to trial and were both found guilty and sentenced to 15 years in prison.

=== Escape from prison and Glenferrie robbery ===
On 24 August 1923 Angus Murray escaped from Geelong Gaol and was not immediately captured.

On 8 October 1923 the Hawthorn Branch of the Commercial Bank next to Glenferrie Station in Melbourne was robbed by two armed men. The Bank Manager, Mr Thomas R. Berriman, was shot when he resisted and £1,851 in notes was stolen. Berriman was admitted to hospital in a serious condition and died two weeks later. A press article prior to arrests being made noted the similarities of this robbery with the 1917 Middle Park bank robbery and mentioned Murray as being one of the culprits of that robbery.

On 11 October 1923, Murray was arrested at a house in St Kilda along with notorious Melbourne gangster Squizzy Taylor by police investigating the bank robbery. Taylor was later released without conviction. Murray was initially charged with having absconded from prison before later being charged with armed robbery and ultimately accomplice to murder in relation to the Glenferrie bank robbery. Police announced they were also searching for Richard Buckley, identified by witnesses as Murray's accomplice in the robbery and the man who shot Berriman, who prior to his death agreed that Murray was not the shooter.

Murray was found guilty of armed robbery and for being an accomplice to the death of Mr Berriman. He was sentenced to death. A subsequent appeal to the High Court was dismissed. Squizzy Taylor's charges were ultimately dropped in relation to this matter. Richard Buckley was not arrested and charged with the murder of Thomas Berriman until 1930, for which he was found guilty and sentenced to death, however the sentence was commuted to life in prison. In 1946, 83-year-old Buckley was released from prison on compassionate grounds—he was dying and his family did not wish him to die in prison.

== Execution ==
Angus Murray's death sentence was unpopular, especially amongst working people, along with political and religious groups. It had been 60 years since an accomplice to murder had been executed in Victoria and it was thought that the identification of Murray as one of the armed robbers was flawed. Several thousand people attended a meeting about Murray's death sentence in Melbourne. Later a petition of 70,000 signatures was presented at State Government House and around 10,000 people attended a protest about the sentence.

In spite of the protests and petition, Angus Murray was hanged at Melbourne Gaol on 14 April 1924. Prior to his execution he made a statement: "Never in my life have I at any time done anything to justify the extreme penalty passed upon me. I try to forgive all those who acted against me, and I hope that any whom I have injured will try to forgive me."

Angus Murray was buried in the grounds of Melbourne Gaol, before his remains were moved in 1937 to Pentridge Gaol. Murray was the last person to be executed at the Gaol.

== Legacy ==
Angus Murray is now best known for his association with Melbourne gangster Squizzy Taylor. He was portrayed in the 1982 Australian movie Squizzy Taylor by Peter Hosking. In the 2013 Australian television series Underbelly: Squizzy he was played by Andrew Ryan. His life, escape from Geelong prison, and execution has also been covered by at least one podcast.
