= Death Penalty Abolition Act 1973 =

1973 Act of the Parliament of Australia

Parliament of Australia
- Long title: An Act to abolish Capital Punishment under the Laws of the Commonwealth, of the States and of the Territories, and under certain other Laws in relation to which the Powers of the Parliament extend.
- Citation: 100 of 1973
- Royal assent: 18 September 1973
- Status: Current legislation

The Death Penalty Abolition Act 1973 is an Act of the Parliament of Australia that abolished capital punishment provisions in the statute law of the Commonwealth of Australia and its internal and external territories.

== Historical background ==
In 1962, Henry Bolte, the Premier of Victoria, brought the issue of capital punishment to the forefront of public attention by calling for the execution of a convicted criminal, Robert Tait. This event sparked the concern of humanist Senator Lionel Murphy, who began working in the Senate to limit the use of capital punishment through various laws e.g. in the Crimes (Aircraft) Bill of 1963. Murphy was a strong believer in the sanctity of human life and made a number of speeches in the Senate against capital punishment. His arguments included the notion that such laws go against the norms of civilised behavior, extreme penalties do not deter crime, capital punishment is subject to misuse, mistakes cannot be rectified, and rehabilitation is impossible.

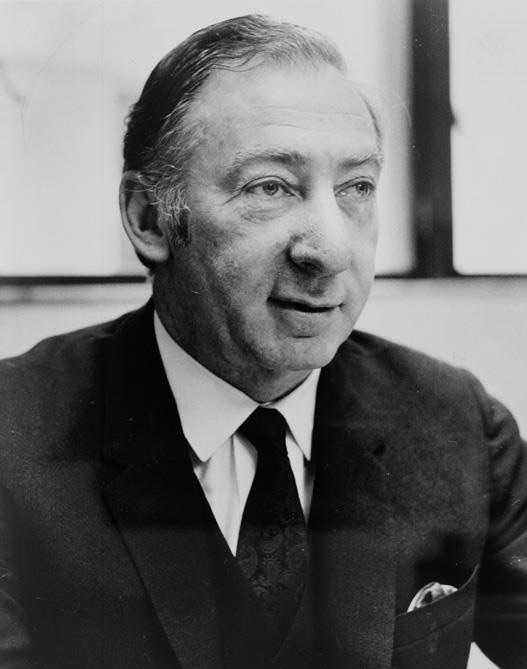
Senator, Attorney-General and later High Court Justice Lionel Murphy, creator of the Death Penalty Abolition Act

On February 3, 1967, Sir Henry Bolte's Liberal government in Victoria executed Ronald Ryan, a convicted criminal. Bolte is quoted as saying, "If you want to win an election have a hanging."

In 1968, Murphy introduced a private members bill, the Death Penalty Abolition Act, which aimed to abolish the use of capital punishment in Australia. The bill was passed in the Senate three times with the support of senators from all political parties, but lapsed in the House of Representatives each time.

Finally, on December 5, 1972, the Whitlam Labor government was elected and the first piece of legislation, on the second day of sitting, introduced by the then Attorney General Lionel Murphy, was his Death Penalty Abolition Act. It passed with the vote of all Labor senators and half the Liberal senators who voted. This marked the end of five years of struggle to abolish capital punishment in Australia. The Bill passed the House of Representatives with a vote of 73 to 27. It was noted that the no vote was predominantly made up of the National Party members.

== See also ==
- Capital punishment in Australia
