= Elizabeth Woolcock =

Australian murderer

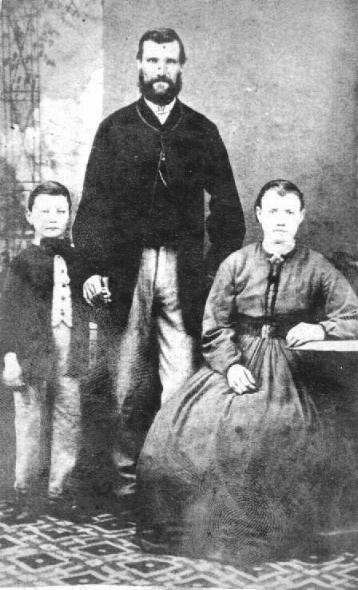
- Thomas and Elizabeth Woolcock
- Born: Elizabeth Lillian Oliver; 20 April 1848; Burra, South Australia
- Died: 30 December 1873 (aged 25); Adelaide Gaol, Thebarton, South Australia
- Cause of death: Execution by hanging
- Spouse: Thomas Woolcock
- Children: Thomas John Woolcock (stepson)
- Conviction: Murder
- Penalty: Death

Elizabeth Lillian Woolcock (née Oliver; 20 April 1848 – 30 December 1873) was an Australian murderer who was hanged in Adelaide Gaol for the murder of her husband Thomas Woolcock by mercury poisoning. She remains the only woman ever executed in South Australia and is buried between the outer and inner prison walls of Adelaide Gaol. It has been argued that she may have been a victim of domestic violence and suffered from battered spouse syndrome.

== Life ==
Elizabeth was born on April 20, 1848, and lived with her family in Burra Burra in South Australia. In January 1852, Elizabeth's father joined the Victorian gold rush and the family moved to Ballarat, taking residence in a tent on the goldfields. When Elizabeth was four years old, her mother moved to Adelaide, leaving the girl to be raised by her father.

In 1855, seven-year-old Elizabeth was raped and left for dead by an itinerant Indian. Two years later her father died of consumption.

In 1865, after receiving news that her mother was alive and looking for her, Elizabeth travelled to Moonta, South Australia and moved in with her mother and stepfather. She taught Sunday school at the Wesleyan Church.

== Thomas Woolcock ==
Thomas Woolcock emigrated from Cornwall and settled in Moonta with his wife and two children in 1865; the next year, his wife and one son died of fever. A widower left with his namesake son Thomas to look after, he hired Elizabeth as a housekeeper. Elizabeth's stepfather disliked Woolcock, and when he heard rumours of more than a work relationship going on between the man and Elizabeth, he threatened to cripple her if she kept seeing him. To stop the gossip, Woolcock married 20-year-old Elizabeth in his cottage's front parlour on October 2, 1867.

Woolcock turned out to be a heavy drinker, a bully, and a wife-beater. Elizabeth attempted to leave him several times, but he continued to find her and bring her back to Moonta. Feeling depressed and alone after her mother and stepfather moved to Adelaide, Elizabeth attempted suicide. She was given Morphine to help with insomnia and melancholy. The situation improved somewhat when Woolcock took in a boarder whose presence lessened the abuse she suffered, but eventually the two men had a dispute and the boarder left. Not long afterward, the family dog died after being poisoned and Thomas suspected the boarder and reported him to the Police. Around this time Elizabeth was seeking medication, mainly morphine, for her ailments, but the chemist refused to prescribe any and she resorted to sending her stepson to pharmacies with notes. She visited a chemist, claiming she needed morphine to "get ink stains out of a skirt", then claimed it was for scurf in her hair. Her desperation to acquire drugs became common knowledge in the community.

== Woolcock's death ==
A month after the dog died, Woolcock became ill with stomach pains and nausea, Elizabeth called in three doctors over the following weeks who each diagnosed different illnesses and prescribed different medications. Dr. Bull prescribed syrup and pills laced with a third of a grain of Mercury each (21 mg) for a sore throat, but Woolcock became considerably worse and Elizabeth then called in Dr. Dickie who diagnosed a gastric disorder and prescribed Rhubarb tablets and cream of tartar, which had no effect. Finally, Dr. Herbert treated him for excessive 'Salivation by Mercury'. This treatment worked and Woolcock improved, but two weeks later he could no longer afford Dr. Herbert's fees so returned to Dr. Dickie, who resumed the treatment for a gastric problem. When his condition failed to improve, Elizabeth suggested returning to Dr. Bull, but according to neighbors and friends who were present and later testified at her trial, Woolcock replied: "I certainly don't want Dr. Bull again, as it was his medicine that made me bad in the first place".

At 3 am on 4 September 1873, Thomas Woolcock died. Dr. Dickie initially stated his patient had died from "pure exhaustion from excessive and prolonged vomiting and purging". Woolcock's cousin, Elizabeth Snell, suggested to the doctor that as everyone knew Woolcock's wife had been getting "Morphia" she could have poisoned him with it, and rumours of foul play began spreading. An inquest was ordered.

== Inquest and trial ==
The inquest was opened in the front parlor of Woolcock's cottage. Dr. Dickie testified on the drugs taken by the deceased and the chemist, Mr. Opie, testified regarding Elizabeth's attempts to get morphine. Elizabeth stated she had nothing to gain from her husband's death. An autopsy was ordered and performed in the cottage that day while Elizabeth waited outside.

The next day the inquest resumed at the Moonta courthouse where Dr. Dickie described the state of the body and suggested that mercury poisoning was a strong probability, Dr. Herbert concurred. Dr. Bull admitted prescribing pills with mercury but insisted Woolcock only took one. Police told the inquest that they had exhumed the Woolcocks' dead dog and found the body too contained large traces of mercury (a known treatment for Ringworm). Several jars considered 'poison' were found in the cottage and the jury decided that Woolcock was poisoned by his wife, and she was arrested.

Elizabeth pleaded not guilty and the trial in Adelaide was a sensation with crowds filling Gouger Street outside the Supreme Court. Elizabeth was provided with an inexperienced lawyer who failed in court against the accomplished Crown Solicitor, Richard Bullock Andrews QC, who argued that Elizabeth had poisoned the dog as an experiment, the ringworm powder was the means and that motive was an affair with the boarder. Defendants at this time were barred from testifying on their own behalf so Elizabeth was unable to answer the accusations. Following a three-day trial the jury, after deliberating for 20 minutes, found her guilty with a recommendation for mercy on account of her youth. The plea for mercy was declined by Governor Anthony Musgrave and she was sentenced to death.

=== Execution and confession ===
On 30 December 1873, dressed in a white frock and carrying a posy of fresh flowers, Elizabeth gave a letter to be opened after her death to her minister, the Reverend James Bickford, and then walked calmly to the gallows.

The letter, describing her life, was badly written with poor spelling and inaccuracies including even getting her own age wrong:

The last Statement and confession of Elizabeth Woolcock to Mr. Bickford.
Sir I was Born in the Burra mine in Provence of South Australia in the year 1847 my parents names were John and Elisabeth Oliver they were Cornish they came to this Couleney in 1842 but they went to Victoria in 1851. I was left without the care of a Mother at the age of 4 years and I never saw her again until I was 18 my father died when I was 9 years old and I had to get my living until I was 18 and then I heard that my Mother was alive and Residing at moonta mine she wrote me a letter asking me to come to her as she had been very unhappy about me and she was very sorry for what she had done I thought I should like to see my Mother and have a home like other young girls so I gave up my Situation and came to Adelaide my mother and my stepfather received me very kindly and I had a good home for 2 years my Mother and Stepfather were members of the Wesleyan Church and I became a Teacher in the Sunday school for 2 years at the End of that time I first saw my late husband Thomas Woolcock I believe my stepfather was a good man but he was very passionate and determined my late husband was a widower with two Children his Wife had been dead about 8 months when I went to keep house for him against stepfathers wishes I kept house for him for 6 Weeks when some one told my stepfather that I was keeping Company with Thomas Woolcock he asked me if it was true and I told him it was not but he would not believe me but called me a liar and told me he would Cripple me if I went with him any had not been with the man but I would go with him now if he asked me if the Divel said I should not this took place on the Thursday morning I saw my husband in the evening and he asked me what was the matter and I told him what had taken place the following Sunday he asked me to go with him for a walk instead of going to Chapel I went and my stepfather missed me from the Chapel and came to look for me and found us both together so I was afraid to go home for has he had said he would break both of my legs I was afraid he would keep his word, as I never knew him to tell a willful lie so I went to a cousins of my husbands and stopped and my husband asked me if I would marry him and for my words sake I did. We were married the next Sunday morning by license after the acquaintance of 7 weeks I was not married long before I found out what sort of a man I had got and that my poor stepfather had advised me for my own good but it was to late then, so I had to make the best of it, I tried to do my duty to him and the children, but the more I tried the worse he was, he was fond of drink but he did not like to part with his money for anything else and god only knows how he ill treated me I put up with it for 3 years during that time my parents went to Melbourne and then he was worse than ever I thought i would rather die than live so I tried to put an end to my self in several different ways, but thank the Lord I did not succeed in doing so as he did not treat me any better and I could not live like that. I thought I would leave him and get my own liven so I left him but he would not leave me alone he came and fetched me home and then I stopped with him twelve months and I left him again with the intention of going to my Mother I only took 6 pounds with me I came down to Adelaide and I stopped with my sister I was here in Adelaide 6 weeks when he came and fetched me back again but he did not behave no better to me I tried my best to please him but I could not there is no foundation at all for the story about the young man called Pascoe he was nothing to me nor I did not give the poor dog any poison for I knew what power the poison had as I took it my self for some months and I was so ill treated that I was quite out of my mind and in an evil hour I yielded to the temptation he was taken ill at the mine and came home and quarreled with me and Satan tempted me and I gave him what I ought not but thought at the time that if i gave him time to prepare to meet his god I should not do any great crime to send him out of the World but I see my mistake now I thank god he had time to make his peace with his maker and I hope I shall meet him in heaven for I feel that god has pardoned all my sins he has forgiven me and washed me white in the precious blood of Jesus I feel this evening that I can rejoice in a loven Saviour I feel his presence hear to night he sustains me and gives me comfort under this heavy trial such as the world can never give. Dear friend if I may call you so I am much obliged to you for your kindness to a poor guilty sinner but great will be your reward in heaven I hope I shall meet you their and I hope that god will keep me faithful to the End o may I be able to say that I live is Christ but to Die will be gain Bless the Lord he will not turn away any that come unto him for he says come unto me all ye that labour and are heavy laden and I will give you rest I feel I have that rest I hope to die singing Victory through the Blood of the lamb I remain sir Yours truly a sinner saved by grace Elizabeth Woolcock.
—Adelaide Observer, 3 January 1874 Source

Since her execution, flowers have been placed by her grave regularly, a tradition that has continued despite the closure of the Gaol.

== Evidence of innocence ==
Experts agree that Elizabeth's "confession" was religiously inspired and prompted by a desire for salvation with an exaggeration of her sins. Police historian Allan Peters says she was "more interested in impressing the Reverend than setting the record straight".

It is unlikely that Elizabeth was having an affair and she had nothing to gain from Woolcock's death. That she cared for him while he was ill was evidenced by his lack of bed sores and witnesses testified that Elizabeth showed no ill will towards her husband.

The dog was treated for ringworm with mercury laced powder and could have died from mercury poisoning after licking the powder on its body.

Woolcock's symptoms were consistent with tuberculosis and dysentery, both of which were found at autopsy, and typhoid, although this was not found. Woolcock's organs, removed at autopsy, had been left unattended and exposed to the air for 24 hours before they were examined which could have compromised the diagnosis.

It was never proven at trial that Woolcock had died of mercury poisoning or that Elizabeth had administered it.

Dr Bull prescribed mercury laced syrup and tablets which would have killed Woolcock if he had taken more than Bull testified to. Bull had been a drug addict himself for 30 years and consumed atropine, sulphuric ether, chloroform and opium in large and frequent doses. He was reportedly in a "drug be-fuddled state" when treating Woolcock and several witnesses testified that Thomas has told them that it was Bull's medicine that had made him so sick. Dr Bull was committed to a psychiatric hospital after the trial and committed suicide several months later.

Two recently discovered letters sent by Samuel Way to relatives in England shortly before he was appointed Chief Justice of South Australia were commentary on the now lost report into the hanging commissioned by the government of the day and headed by his brother Dr Edward Way. Edward he wrote, concurred with the analytical chemist that the evidence on administration of the poison was "unreliable" and that the "medical evidence mistaken". The implication is that she did not poison Woolcock and that even if she had been guilty she did not receive justice based on the available evidence.

=== Application for posthumous pardon ===
In January 2009, after 30 years of research, Police historian Allan Peters applied to the State Attorney General Michael Atkinson for a posthumous pardon. In 2010, Peters and his daughter Leeza distributed petitions throughout the Copper Coast and online, urging people to sign and support a posthumous pardon for Elizabeth. The signed petitions along with detailed documentation and evidence was delivered to the Governor of South Australia Rear Admiral Kevin Scarce on 28 September 2011. The request was declined.

Records show that Elizabeth and Thomas had a baby named Thomas Woolcock on March 23, 1873, but he died on April 9, 1873.
