= Glen Sabre Valance =

Australian murderer

Glen Valance
- Valance after his arrest
- Born: Graham Paul Fraser; 11 February 1943; South Australia
- Died: 24 November 1964 (aged 21); Adelaide Gaol, South Australia
- Occupation: Station Hand
- Height: 6 ft 4 in (1.93 m)
- Status: Executed by hanging
- Motive: Revenge
- Conviction: Murder
- Penalty: Death (17 September 1964)

Details
- Victims: Richard Strang, 37
- Date: 16 June 1964
- Country: Australia
- State: South Australia
- Weapon: Rifle

Glen Sabre Valance (born Graham Paul Fraser; 11 February 1943 – 24 November 1964) was an Australian murderer. He was the last man executed in South Australia, and the second-to-last man to be executed anywhere in Australia. In 1964, he was hanged in Adelaide Gaol for the murder of his boss, Richard Strang.

== Early life ==
Born Graham Paul Fraser, he changed his name as a teenager to Glen Sabre Valance after Liberty Valance, the title character of a 1962 western film.

According to Valance's stepsister, Lillian Clavell, he suffered physical and sexual abuse from his mother and boys' homes and orphanages. Their mother left Valance to be taken care of by their grandmother when he was a child, but took him back when the older woman died six years later. According to Clavell, Valance's mother burned his hands on the stove and pushed his face through a glass window. On one occasion, she held a knife to his throat and threatened to kill him if he ever stole anything from the cupboard again.

In 2010, she published a book titled A Tormented Soul, in which she wrote about Valance's life, saying his upbringing had created an angry young man. Clavell said she did not want to excuse her stepbrother's crime, but wanted to give context to his life.

== Crime ==
Valance and his boss, 37-year-old Richard Strang, had been in a feud over wages. Valance had become increasingly angry after Strang leveled accusations of theft against him. The final straw for Valance came weeks before the murder, when Strang read his private diary aloud, amusing the other workers.

In the early hours of 16 June 1964, Valance, armed with a rifle, tied up three station hands at the Koonroon property near Bordertown, South Australia then entered the bedroom of Richard and Suzanne Strang. Valance fatally shot Richard as he was sleeping. He then went on to rape his wife, who was next to him. He did not harm the couple's two sleeping children, who were one and two years old. Afterwards, Valance drove towards Adelaide. Suzanne called the police and Valance was captured at a road block near Murray Bridge. The rifle was in the car with him.

== Trial and execution ==
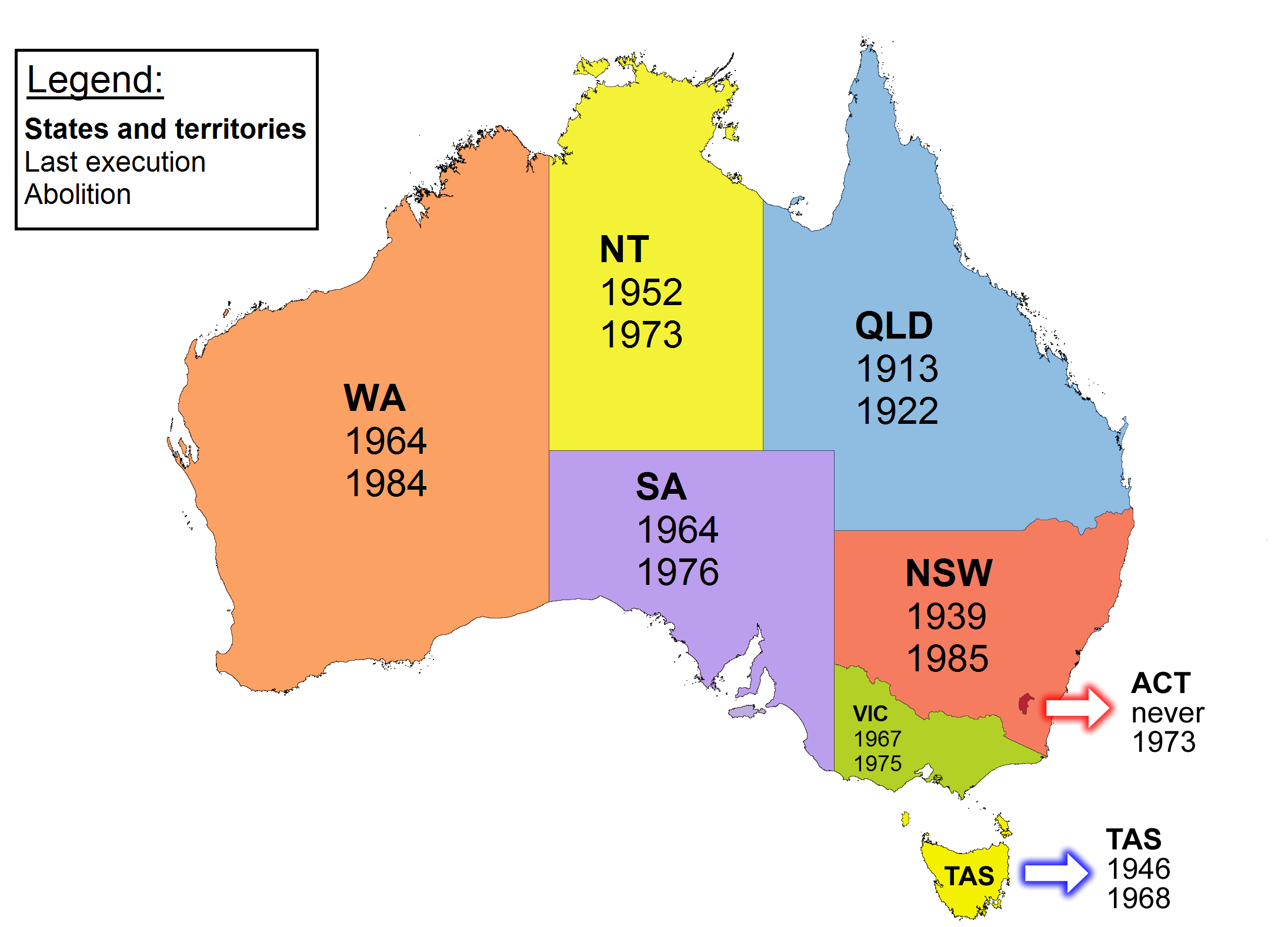
Dates of last executions & abolition

Valance claimed he had a grievance with Richard Strang: he once worked for Strang, but was sacked after being accused of theft. Strang had legal proceedings against Valance accusing him of theft, while Valance claimed Strang had owed him money and refused to pay, further blaming Strang for having his car repossessed.

Valance pleaded insanity, but was found guilty of murder and sentenced to death by South Australian State Chief Justice Sir Mellis Napier on 17 September 1964. The Supreme Court of South Australia dismissed his appeal on 9 October, and a further application to the High Court of Australia for leave to appeal was rejected on 9 November. According to Clavell, Valance was indifferent to his fate and did not want to be reprieved, saying "In the end, he said, 'No more appeals. Let me go. I can't live with what I've done.'"

Although many in the public had initially wanted Valance to be reprieved, most of them became indifferent after learning about the rape.

After being denied a reprieve, Valance was hanged on 24 November 1964. The sentence was carried out at Adelaide jail in a guard tower that had been converted into an execution facility by the installation of a gallows in 1950 (the "Hanging Tower") and was the newest gallows in Australia after the one at Fannie Bay, Darwin (1952). The gallows survives, and the date 24 November 1964 and the letters GSV still remain painted on the inner perimeter wall above the grave, in the area of the prison set aside for burial of executed prisoners.

Valance was the last man executed in South Australia, and the second to last in Australia; the last was Ronald Ryan, who was executed in Victoria on 3 February 1967.
