= Greenough Regional Prison =

Western Australian prison

- Interactive map of Greenough Regional Prison
- Location: Narngulu, Western Australia; 28°50′05″S 114°41′57″E
- Status: Operational
- Security class: Maximum (remand), medium, minimum (Male and female)
- Capacity: 323
- Opened: October 1984
- Managed by: Department of Justice, Western Australia

Greenough Regional Prison is an Australian prison located in Narngulu, a suburb of Geraldton, Western Australia. The prison was opened in 1984 and had an operational capacity of 328 as of November 2012. The prison houses prisoners from around the Mid West region, including a large proportion of Aboriginal prisoners. A mix of maximum (remand), medium and minimum security prisoners are held at Greenough, including 25 female prisoners, with two cells available for mothers and babies and a minimum security facility that houses 36 male prisoners.

Six allegedly drunk prisoners escaped from the facility in 1989 after throwing mattresses over razor wire and climbing over. The prisoners had secretly brewed the alcohol in the prison and consumed it prior to their escape.

Two prisoners escaped from the minimum security section of the prison in 2008 after digging their way out under a security fence using a pool cue and a dust pan.

A report released in 2010 on conditions in the prison found that conditions were degrading with overcrowding, forcing up to three inmates to share cells that were designed to hold one. At the time the prison was designed to hold a total population of 219 had was found to have 260 inmates being housed. Bunk beds used at the facility were found to be a safety risk.

Marlon Noble was held at Greenough for 10 years without being charged with a crime; he was released in 2012. Later the same year three prison officers were injured when attempting to break up a fight between thrill killer Valerie Parashumti and another inmate. Parashumti attempted to escape in 2013 and managed to breach at least one fence before being recaptured and moved to a management cell. On 24 July 2018, ten prisoners escaped from the facility.
