= Adelaide Gaol =

Museum in Adelaide, South Australia

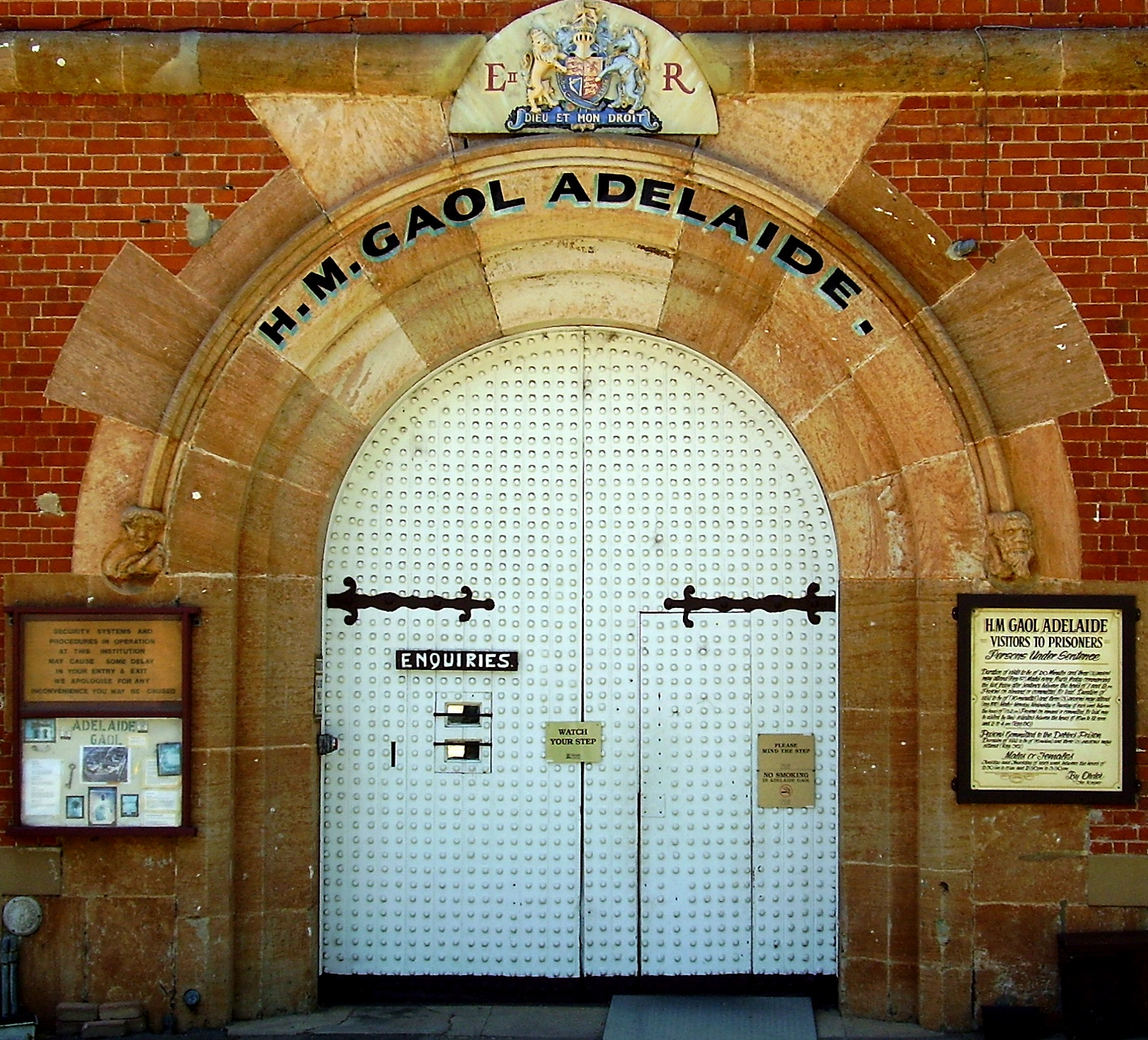

- Location in South Australia
- Location: Adelaide, South Australia; 34°55′03″S 138°35′06″E
- Status: Closed
- Opened: 1841
- Closed: 1988
- Managed by: Department of Environment, Water and Natural Resources
- Website: http://www.adelaidegaol.sa.gov.au/

South Australian Heritage Register
- Official name: Adelaide Gaol
- Designated: 8 November 1984
- Reference no.: 10937

Adelaide Gaol is a former Australian prison located in the Park Lands of Adelaide, in the state of South Australia. The gaol was the first permanent one in South Australia and operated from 1841 until 1988. The Gaol is one of the two oldest buildings still standing in South Australia, the other being Government House which was built at the same time. The prison is now a museum, tourist attraction and function centre.

== Origins ==
When the first colonists arrived at South Australia in late 1836, any prisoners (there were few at first) were held in irons aboard the ships HMS Buffalo and then Tam O'Shanter. In early 1837 the public were warned that escaped convicts from New South Wales may reach the colony and in mid-1837 Buffalo and Tam O'Shanter sailed away. Recognising the need, tenders had already been called for a "temporary" gaol. Meanwhile, the governor's guard of Royal Marines held prisoners in their encampment in the present Botanic Gardens, chained to a tree.

As the population expanded, a temporary lock-up became necessary, which was built in early 1838 near Government House, Adelaide (then a mere hut) so the marines could guard both prisoners and Governor John Hindmarsh. This was a wooden slab affair, with timber palisade fences, although one room was freestone, which became known as the 'stone jug'. It was located at the north-east corner of present Government House Domain. In 1838, the first sheriff, Samuel Smart, was wounded during a robbery that led to one of the offenders, Michael Magee, becoming the first person to be hanged in South Australia on 2 May 1838. When Governor Hindmarsh left, he also took all his marines, so the South Australia Police then ran the temporary gaol (through until Adelaide Gaol was built). Long term prisoners were sentenced to transportation in the eastern penal colonies, escorted there by police on inter-coastal ships. Even so, the gaol was overcrowded, sometimes holding up to seventy prisoners. Parts of the gaol became so "dilapidated that if it had not been for the building behind, [it] would have collapsed". In July 1838, it was reported that prisoners easily escaped because "the walls were rotten and there were gaps in the foundation".

When Governor George Gawler arrived he was appalled at the conditions, saying that security was only being maintained by an "expensive multiplicity of sentries". London police sub-inspectors James Stuart and William Baker Ashton arrived in November 1838 to form the first police force, but found it had already been formed, in April 1838, under Henry Inman. Sensing that the gaol needed its own professional management, Gawler thereupon appointed Ashton to the new position of Governor of the Gaol, effective 1 January 1839, but still answerable to Inman for funding, administration, and staff.

== Construction and disputation ==
Although Governor Gawler was under orders from the Select Committee on South Australia in Britain not to undertake any public works, in 1840 George Strickland Kingston was commissioned to design a permanent Gaol to hold 140 prisoners. The plans were based on England's Pentonville prison. Proceedings of the Select Committee indicate that in Britain nothing was known of the gaol's construction and there is no record of any mention in any official dispatches from South Australia.

The original estimate for construction was £17,000 (2011 $4,564,500), however in late July 1840, one month after construction began, the plans were altered by Governor George Gawler. Although all the foundations had been laid the new plans halved the building work, which effectively reduced the contract cost to £10,000 although this did not include the cost of work already completed. In October, Gawler again altered the plans by now including the gaoler's house he had earlier dropped from the original plans, added two more towers and increased the quality of the stonework by specifying ashlar which cost fifty percent more than the wrought stone specified in the original contract. These new alterations added £9,000 to the cost. By March 1841 the gaol was nearing completion, the builders Borrow and Goodiar had already received £10,950 and they now requested a further £8,733 which Gawler refused. The dispute resulted in the claim being arbitrated in court and the arbitrators requested an independent valuation of the work completed.

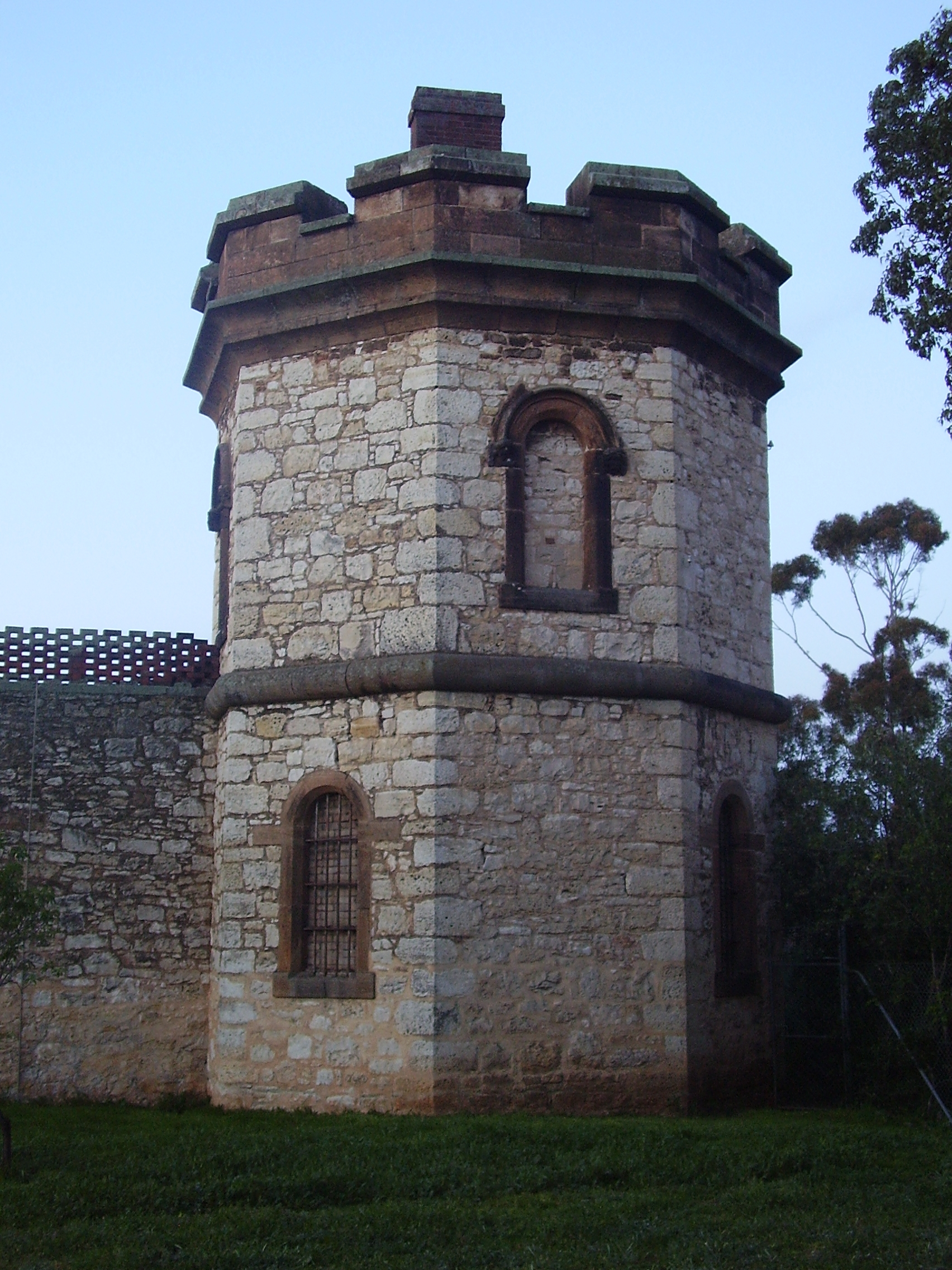
Adelaide gaol tower

In May, Gawler was replaced by George Grey who accused Gawler of acting "under no authority whatever". Gawler denied responsibility for the work and blamed Kingston. Kingston himself claimed the work was authorised by the Board of Works who denied even inspecting the site despite evidence they did so weekly. As Gawler had kept no documentation whatsoever regarding the contract it could not be determined who was responsible and Kingston's appointment was later terminated on 4 August, six days after the gaol was completed. In early September the valuation was completed with the value of work estimated at more than £32,000 above the sum already paid, which the court awarded to Borrow and Goodiar. On 5 November the builders submitted a claim for the £32,000 plus interest, commission, legal costs and arbitration fees of more than £4,000 (2011: $9,666,000 in total). Grey refused and threatened to put the case before the British Government. In February 1842 Grey commissioned another valuation that presented a revised valuation of £19,650 (2011: $5,276,000) based solely on the original plans, which was offered to the builders. It was initially declined but accepted following pressure from the Bank of South Australia with whom Borrow and Goodiar had an £11,000 (2011: $2,954,000) overdraft. By the end of 1842 both of the colonies newspapers had taken up the cause in favour of the builders and a memorial was presented to the Secretary of the Colonies in Britain, demanding that the arbitration decision be honoured or put before a jury trial. The sum was reluctantly paid, although the actual construction costs still resulted in the builders declaring bankruptcy.

The cost blow out to approximately £40,000 (2011: $10,740,000), being a fifth of the total funding for the establishment of the newly settled colony, was the main cause of a statewide depression and numerous bankruptcies. Governor Gawler was summoned back to England to explain his "extravagant" building program. Originally designed to have four ornate turrets, only two towers were completed, and only one of those was the ornate turret as planned.

== History ==
On Christmas Eve, 24 December 1840, the first prisoners, some fourteen debtors, were transferred from the old temporary gaol to occupy the first yard to be completed at the new Adelaide Gaol. Remaining prisoners at the old gaol were transferred in early 1841, as further building work was completed. William Baker Ashton became the first governor, a position he held until his death 1854. From that time the police no longer staffed the gaol, as Ashton now had his own budget. Also, he was now fully answerable to the sheriff, instead of the commissioner of police. Gaol staff consisted of two "turnkeys" and two guards. During this time the gaol was commonly referred to by the public as Ashton's Hotel. From 1867 to 1869 Sister Mary MacKillop, foundress of the Australian Sisters of Saint Joseph and later canonised as Australia's first Saint, regularly visited the gaol and along with members of her order tended both male and female prisoners. Sister Mary's order initially provided assistance for female prisoners after their release until November 1867 when the order extended its services to all women. At times the prison was guarded by a number of troops on loan from Tasmania until 1846 when Francis Dutton, who went on to become the seventh Premier of South Australia in 1863, complained that the gaol was both an eyesore and a waste of money as since being opened it had housed on average only two prisoners per month.

The first attempt at escaping occurred in August 1854 when two prisoners were caught in the act with each receiving 36 lashes. The first "successful" escape was in 1897 when three prisoners made it as far as Blanchetown before being recaptured.

In 1942 the "New Building" was taken over by the military for use as a detention barracks. The gallows located in the building were used for a civilian execution on 26 April 1944. Following public protests over the unsanitary conditions at both Yatala Labour Prison and Adelaide Gaol, extensive renovations were carried out in 1954–55. A toilet block was constructed in 4 and 6 yards and a semi-circular wall built in "The Circle" to allow more privacy for visits. Previously, prisoners would line up toeing a brass rail in the Sally port of the main gate with visitors standing opposite and no closer than 2 metres (6.6 ft) which required the raising of voices to be heard over adjacent conversations. Former prisoners have stated that after a few minutes the noise level would be so high that no one could be heard. In 1955 a doctor was retained to make daily visits, Previously, a prisoner needed to "prove" they were ill before being taken to see a doctor. In 1961 a shower block was constructed and a bakery established which would supply bread to both Yatala and Adelaide Gaols. By this time the gaol was badly affected by salt damp and throughout the 1960s many prisoners were kept busy repairing it. In 1963 the Deputy Keeper's rooms in the governor's residence were converted to administrative offices and a new residence was built in the forecourt, adjacent to the gaol entrance.

In 1965 it was announced that the gaol would be demolished and all but essential maintenance work ceased. In 1969 this decision was reversed and the gaol's female inmates were transferred to a new facility at Northfield. Throughout the 1970s considerable modernisation of the old buildings occurred with one building (6 Yard remand prisoners) demolished and rebuilt. In 1971 all staff housing on the site was vacated with most of the guards former residences demolished.

In 1980 it was announced that the gaol would be closed once new facilities were completed and the only major work that took place until it did close was the installation of security cameras in 1984. Later that year the remand prisoners were transferred to the new Adelaide Remand Centre. The remaining Adelaide Gaol prisoners were transferred in 1987 when Mobilong Prison opened.

Adelaide Gaol was decommissioned in 1988 and the site taken over by the South Australian Department for Environment and Heritage and reopened as a museum and tourist attraction with overnight accommodation in cells for tourists. In 2007, the gaol was found to not comply with the relevant safety regulations for accommodation, ending the option. The Deputy Keeper's residence, built in 1963, was later considered not in keeping with the overall architectural style of the complex and demolished in October 2009.

Other sites deemed not to comply in keeping were the library in Three Yard and the shower facilities area in Four Yard.

=== Layout ===
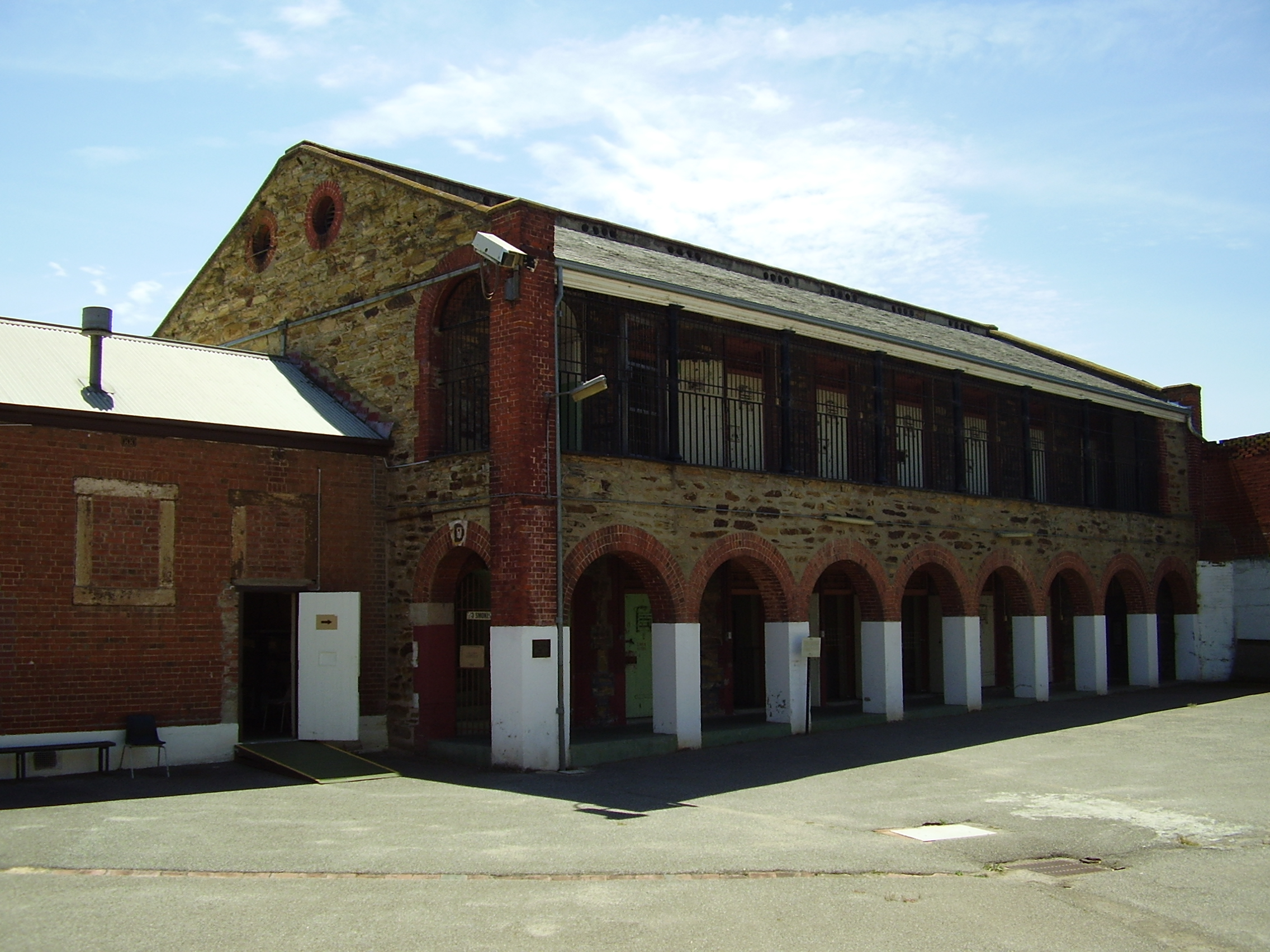
Adelaide Gaol Yard 4 cell block

The Gaol has a radial plan which means access is gained to all the cellblocks and exercise yards from one central point. This point was called "The Circle" as wagons delivering supplies or prisoners to the gaol would have to complete a full circle to leave. The cellblocks were divided into "yards" which offered varied facilities and housing for prisoners based on their category.

- Yard 1 was built in 1850 to house women, which it did until 1969 when all female prisoners were transferred to a new facility at Adelaide Women's Prison. This block then had various uses such as for remand prisoners or for those with infectious diseases. The block was later renamed The Lane, as it both bordered, and was accessed from, the lane that separated the administration buildings from the cell blocks. In the mid- sixties the upstairs sections were gutted to provide ground floor open dormitory accommodation for prisoners deemed low risk. These prisoners wore suede shoes (work boots were the norm for prisoners) and could have personal items containing materials normally banned, such as glass in photograph frames. It also gave easier access to the industries which were in The Lane, like the Bakehouse and Laundry (which was directly below).
- Yard 2 consisted of a three-storey cell block which also originally housed female prisoners, this cell block extended into Yard One.
- Yard 3 was originally the Debtors' Yard before they were moved to Yard 5. This was then taken over by the women until their move in December 1969. This yard contains the dormitory built specifically for the women in 1965. It also contains the Induction Centre which was where prisoners were taken after being processed. They could have their shower and change clothes here. This was constructed in 1978. There was also a library in this yard plus the original women's kitchen.
- Yard 4 consisted of two-storey cell blocks which housed the male prisoners. The last three cells in the cell block on the right facing into the yard were the condemned cells. Those under sentence of death were placed in here for the night. There was another area in the Laneway where they would spend time during the day.
- Yard 6 included what was previously yard 5 after the separating wall was removed. As one of the yard 4 cellblocks was part of the wall separating the yards, the east side lower floor was only accessible from yard 6. The yard's own single storey cellblock was demolished and replaced with a new building in the 1970s – this was the dining area serving that particular yard. This yard was for prisoners on remand. This was the first section to be vacated once the Remand Centre in the city was opened in 1986.
- The New Building, the only building in the Gaol constructed by prison labour, was built in 1878 and opened in 1879 to accommodate increasing prisoner numbers. Called the "New Building" at the time, the name remained and is still the official name of the building. A permanent gallows was built in the A-Wing of the New Building which was used until 1950.

Several yards also contained ablution blocks; cells contained buckets for use as toilets and these were emptied and cleaned here.

=== Daily routine ===
At 7 am, breakfast was delivered to, and eaten in, the cell. At 8 am the cell was inspected to make sure that it was clean and tidy. Toilet buckets were then taken into the yards to be emptied and cleaned by volunteers (this was one of the highest-paid of the few jobs available at the gaol). The set-up for the New Building was slightly different in that buckets were left by one of the doors leading out and picked up prior to prisoners returning to their cells in the evening.

As there were few recreational facilities available, most inmates would constantly walk up and down the yards or just sit and talk or play cards. Inmates returned to their cells at 11 am for lunch, after which they could return to the yards. Inmates returned to their cells at 4 pm when dinner was served and the lights were turned out at 10 pm. At the beginning and end of every meal break, prisoners were counted and a roll call taken.

Each inmate was provided with a black Felt jacket and work boots. Twice a week trolleys containing a change of clothing were brought to the yards. Each week inmates were provided with 2 1/2 ounces (71 g) of loose tobacco, papers and matches. Volunteering inmates provided services such as maintenance, cleaning and hairdressing without pay to relieve the routine. Recreational facilities were limited to a library of donated books and decks of cards. Paper and pens, which had to be returned after use, were provided once a week for prisoners to write two letters, while writing materials were banned at other times.

From 1841 to 1988 around 300,000 inmates passed through the gaol. The highest number of prisoners held at one time was 440 in the 1960s, when many were forced to sleep three in a cell. The gaol also had overcrowding problems after the riots at Yatala Labour Prison in 1983. Buildings were burned and some inmates were transferred temporarily to Adelaide Gaol. Normally inmates on remand were allowed to sleep two to a cell which, although having the same dimensions as single cells, were provided with a bunk bed. Prior to the 1960s, the average age of inmates was approximately 22 years but during the 1970s this average dropped to 19 years of age. Once sentenced, those with terms of three months or less would be placed in single cells, while those with longer sentences were transferred to Yatala Labour Prison, the Cadell Training Centre and, until it closed in 1975, Gladstone Gaol. Inmates who possessed certain useful skills, such as cooks, and who were sentenced to many years imprisonment would often remain at Adelaide Gaol to serve their sentences.

== Criminals ==
Until an Act of Parliament in 1858 mandated private executions, seven hangings were held in public outside the gaol gate with the first occurring in November 1840 while the site was still under construction. Joseph Stagg was the first prisoner to be executed for his involvement with a cattle duffing gang. From 1861 to 1883, 13 prisoners were executed on portable gallows erected between the Gaol's inner and outer walls. Executions were moved to the "New Building" in 1894 where a further 21 prisoners were executed. The "Hanging Tower" was converted to that use in 1950 and used for the last four executions before capital punishment was abolished in 1976. From 1840 to 1964, 45 of the 66 people executed in South Australia were executed by hanging at the Gaol. William Ridgway was the youngest at 19 in 1874, Elizabeth Woolcock the only woman in 1873 and the last was Glen Sabre Valance in 1964.

Five prisoners were executed from the original temporary Adelaide Gaol. They were not executed on site. The first three executions took place in the parklands west of Montefiore Hill, and the final 2 were hanged together in the original police barracks that still stand off North Terrace. They were buried in unmarked graves.

== Archaeology ==
In 2007, a volunteer fell through rotting floorboards in a yard 2 building formerly used as the Prison officers recreation area and tea room. Underneath the floor were found the remains of a previously unknown building which resulted in a two-year archaeological investigation. It had long been suspected that South Australia's first settlers had camped somewhere along the River Torrens while waiting for the city to be laid out. The investigations revealed that this site may have been that original camp site. The archaeological dig revealed five distinct levels.

Level one Pre 1836: shows evidence of hunting, fishing and camping by the indigenous inhabitants before settlement. Objects found include stone tools and weapons.

Level two 1836 to 1840: evidence of the tents and mud huts of the first settlers. Objects found include animal bones, ceramics, glass, metal, buttons and a child's tooth. As the settlers had no sheep, a sheep bone confirmed that there was contact between the states.

Level three 1840 to 1847: evidence of the area being used as a work site. The builders of the Gaol, Borrow and Goodiar employed 200 workers who camped nearby. Objects found include scraps of metal, iron, broken bricks, mortar, buttons and animal bone from the workers meals.

Level four 1847 to 1900: the original floor of the building. The building was the same shape as it is today but had a wooden floor divided into six cells which were in use by female prisoners from 1847 to 1867 when the building was converted to work rooms and a Matron's room. The Matron's room contained a fireplace with the coke to fuel it stored beneath the floor of the room opposite. A wall outside of the Matron's room had traces of coke on both sides but may have been from a forge used during the earlier construction. Found in the cracks of the floorboards were needles, pins, thimbles, oakum, string and buttons.

Level five 1900 to 1988: the current building. Used as a recreation area and tea room by the time the gaol closed, the underfloor area showed use as a bathroom, laundry and kitchen with two concrete reinforcing slabs probably laid during the 1920s to support copper boilers. Objects found include cutlery, tea bags and sugar sachets.

The excavations have been left open for public viewing and some of the retrieved items are on display in the building.

== Notable prisoners ==
- Elizabeth Woolcock
- Rupert Maxwell Stuart
- Bevan Spencer von Einem
- Valerio Ricetti
- Sarah Francisco

== Museum ==
The Adelaide Gaol Museum offers educational guided tours lasting 60 minutes. The tours are interactive. Primary school tours emphasize prisoner life within Adelaide Prison, the intermediate years are based on a Poetry Slam competition where students make up Haikus and the high school tour culminates in a specific debate. All students have the opportunity to explore the courtyards and jail cells, touch artifacts such as handcuffs and escape ropes and contemplate the dark history of South Australia.

== Tourism ==
The Gaol is open for self-guided tours 7 days a week from 10 am to 4 pm (last entry 3 pm). Ghost tours also operate at night.

== Adelaide Park Lands and Dame Roma Mitchell Gardens ==
The Gaol is located within Park 27 / Tulya Wardli of the Adelaide Park Lands. The Dame Roma Mitchell Gardens are a community garden located within the gaol walls. Until 1988 the gardens were tended by prisoners. The gardens are now a source of fruit, vegetables and flowers donated for use in meals for the homeless and food hampers for the needy. The gardens are now tended by volunteers, and funded by charities and corporate donations.
