= Murder of John Hurford =

1855 murder in Western Australia

The murder of John Hurford occurred on 8 April 1855 in Western Australia. His murder led to the first execution of a woman in Western Australia, for the crime of murder.

== Background ==
Hurford arrived in the colony of Western Australia in 1830. He was granted 400 hectares of land at Augusta and purchased a further 100 hectares at Wonnerup Inlet near Busselton. By the age of 65, he had amassed a fortune of £2,000. He married Bridget Larkin in 1851. She had been widowed when her husband had drowned in Bunbury. There were six children of this earlier marriage.

The relationship was not to be a happy one. Larkin was abusive towards her new husband. Hurford alleged to a friend that Larkin had knocked out some of his teeth during an argument. By February 1855 he had had enough and left the house. He stayed with his neighbour sharing a room with a workhand, George Jones. He stayed there for six weeks refusing to return to the matrimonial home. He purchased another house with the intention of moving there and living there without his wife.

Before moving to his new home, he was forced to return to his matrimonial home in late March 1855 because of the lack of space at his neighbour's premises. Jones continued to share the room with Hurford. On 8 April 1855 Hurford was not well. He had a cold and felt sore and fatigued. His wife offered him some mulled wine which he accepted. His wife also sent word to Jones that Hurford wished to sleep on his own that night because of his illness. She sent her daughter away, too.

Later that night Hurford was found in bed with the sheet drawn up to his face, his eyes wide open and slightly protruding. Jones noticed a red mark on the left and right sides of Hurford's neck.

== Investigation ==
An inquest was held by the Coroner. The evidence of Dr Hannibal Bryan led to a finding of natural death by the coroner. Bryan gave evidence that Hurford had died of natural causes.

Later that month, Enoch Dodd confessed the murder to his friend Philip Dixon. Dixon had earlier forged Hurford's will in favour of Larkin. Dodd said that he had killed Hurfield at the urging of Larkin. Larkin had plied Dodd with alcohol. When Dodd had baulked at performing the murder, Larkin had stood over Dodd and made sure that Dodd had completed the deed. Larkin made noise in the kitchen to cover up the ensuing struggle.

== Trial ==
The pair were arrested and committed for trial on 28 August 1855 on murder charges. The trial was held in the Court of General Quarter Sessions on 3 October 1855 before a crowded court room. Dr Bryan was called as a defence witness and testified that he had not seen any strangulation marks on Hurfield's neck. Under cross-examination by the Crown, he admitted that he had not passed a medical examination. He was also unable to explain how to use a stethoscope. On the second day of the trial, Larkin confessed to the murder.

Both Dodd and Larkin were found guilty and sentenced to death by hanging. They were hanged on the following Monday in Perth Prison. Dixon was charged with conspiracy to forge the will. He pleaded guilty and was transported to Van Diemen's Land for the term of his natural life. Both Dodd and Larkin were the first executions in the new prison, and Larkin was the first woman to be hanged in Western Australia.

== Sources ==
- Brian Purde, "Legal Executions in Western Australia". Foundation Press. 1993.
- About Busselon Court House. Department of Justice, Western Australia.
- The West Australian Newspaper. 3 October 1885 (p31)
- "THE ALLEGED MURDER AND FORGERY AT THE VASSE." The Perth Gazette. Friday 14 September 1855, page 3.
- "QUARTER SESSIONS. [Before His Honor W. H. MACK, Esq., and Bench of Magistrates". The Perth Gazette, Friday 5 October 1855, page 2
- "PUBLIC EXECUTIONS." The Perth Gazette. Friday 19 October 1855, page 3
- The Maitland Mercury. Supplement to the Maitland Mercury, page 3. Saturday 8 December 1855
- "Domestic Sayings and Doings." The Perth Gazette Friday 31 August 1855, page 2
- Dictionary of Western Australians: Pre-1839-1888
- "True and Infamous Crimes of Australia" Allan Peters p44. BAS Publishing. Sydney. ISBN 978-1-920910-82-2
