= Mount Gambier Gaol =

Heritage-listed site in South Australia

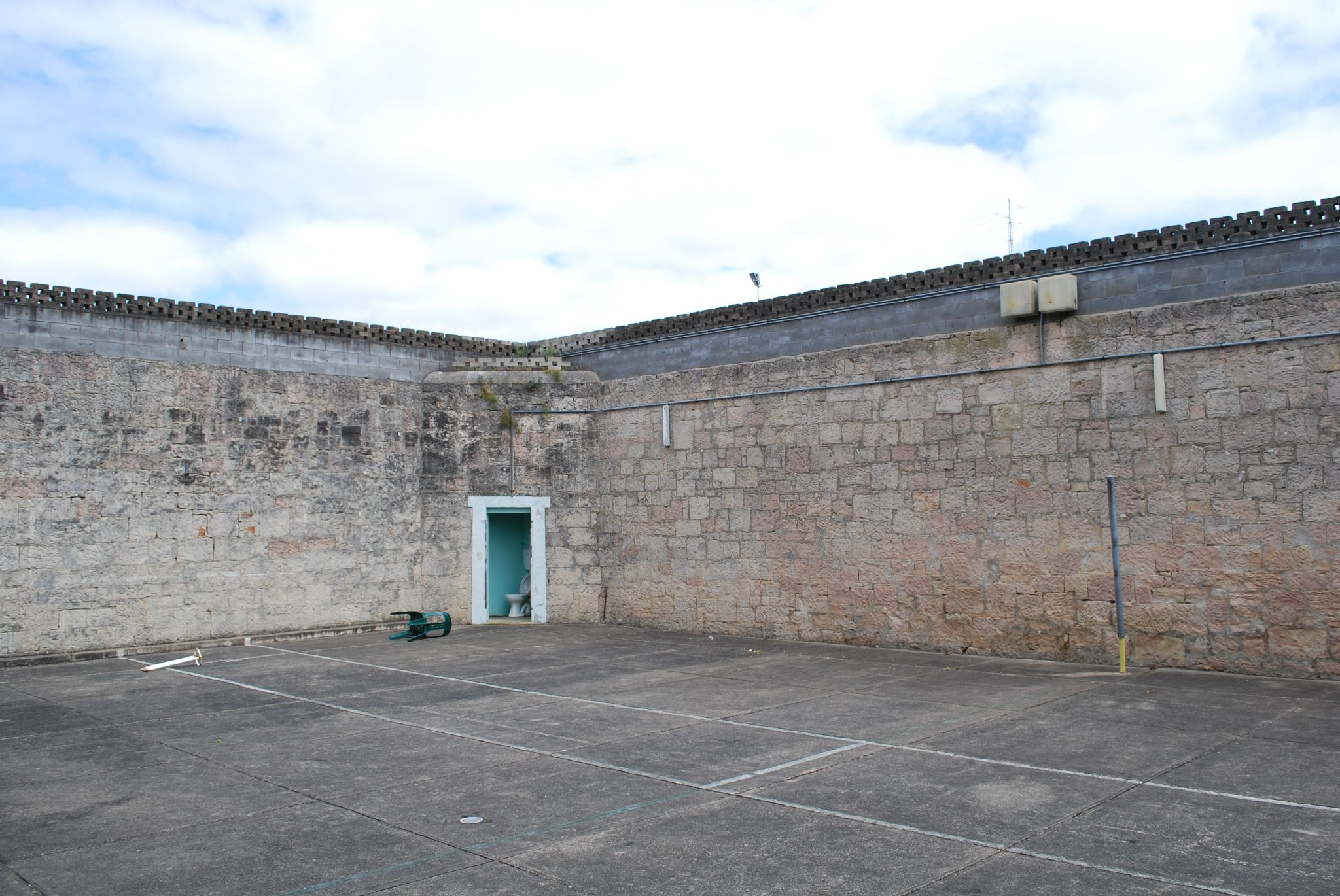
- The prison yard

- Location within South Australia
- Location: Mount Gambier, South Australia; 37.833°S 140.773°E
- Status: Closed
- Opened: 1866; 160 years ago
- Closed: 1995; 31 years ago
- Website: theoldmountgambiergaol.com.au

Mount Gambier Gaol is a heritage-listed former prison and now converted accommodation and events venue in Mount Gambier, South Australia. It is listed on the South Australian Heritage Register.

It was first planned in 1862, but saw extended delays in construction, and was finally completed on 8 January 1866, four years after initially planned, opening on 4 April 1866. An extension for a women's section was added in 1873. The gaol closed in 1995, when the new Mount Gambier Prison opened on a different site. It later operated as a backpackers hostel for several years.

In 2010, it was taken over and thoroughly restored as a hotel and a wedding and events venue, transforming former cells into rooms for guests to stay in.
