= James Johnson =

James Johnson may refer to:

== Artists, actors, authors, and musicians ==
- BabyTron (James Edward Johnson IV, born 2000), American rapper
- James Austin Johnson (born 1989), American comedian & actor, Saturday Night Live cast member
- James B. Johnson (born 1944), author of science nonfiction novels
- James P. Johnson (1894–1955), New Jersey jazz musician, known for his "stride" piano playing
- James Weldon Johnson (1871–1938), African-American figure in the Harlem Renaissance
- James Johnson (author and priest) (1674–1740), English author and cleric
- James Johnson (engraver) (1753–1811), Scottish publisher
- James Johnson (English artist) (1803–1834), English artist
- James "Stump" Johnson (1902–1969), St. Louis blues musician
- Jamey Johnson (born 1975), country musician
- J. C. Johnson (1896–1981), songwriter and jazz pianist sometimes erroneously known as James C. Johnson, best known for his collaborations with Fats Waller
- James F. Johnson (1926–2000), American blues musician
- Super Chikan (James Johnson, born 1951), American blues musician
- Rick James (James Ambrose Johnson Jr., 1948–2004), American singer
- Raymond St. Jacques (James Arthur Johnson, 1930–1990), actor
- James Johnson (woodcarver), Tlingit artist from Juneau, Alaska

== Military figures ==
- James Allen Johnson (1924–2016), major general in U.S. Army Corps of Engineers
- James Bulmer Johnson (1889–1943), recipient of the Victoria Cross during World War I
- James E. Johnson (1926–1950), Korean War Medal of Honor recipient
- James H. Johnson Jr. (born 1937), lieutenant general in the U.S. Army
- James H. Johnson (major general) (1929–2008), major general in the U.S. Army
- James K. Johnson (1916–1997), Korean War flying ace
- James Johnson (South African Navy officer) (1918–1990), chief of the South African Navy
- Johnnie Johnson (RAF officer, born 1915) (James E. Johnson, 1915–2001), WWII RAF fighter ace

== Political figures ==
- James Johnson (Virginia congressman) (died 1825), U.S. congressman from Virginia
- James Johnson (Kentucky politician) (1774–1826), U.S. congressman from Kentucky
- James Johnson (Georgia politician) (1811–1891), U.S. congressman and governor of Georgia
- James Johnson (Iowa politician) (born 1939), state representative of Iowa
- James Johnson (British politician) (1908–1995), British Labour MP for Rugby, 1950–1959, and Hull West, 1964–1983
- James A. Johnson (California politician) (1829–1896), U.S. congressman and lieutenant governor from California
- James A. Johnson (businessman) (1943–2020), businessman, Democratic lobbyist, and chairman of Fannie Mae, the Kennedy Center and the Brookings Institution
- James A. C. Johnson (1867–1937), mayor of Englewood, New Jersey
- James Coody Johnson (1864–1927), African-Creek entrepreneur, interpreter, lawyer and politician
- James D. Johnson (1924–2010), Arkansas politician
- James E. Johnson (United States Navy) (1926–1950), U.S. Assistant Secretary of the Navy
- James F. P. Johnson, member of the Florida House of Representatives
- James G. Johnson (1855–1936), mayor of Springfield and justice on the Ohio Supreme Court
- James Hutchins Johnson (1802–1887), U.S. congressman from New Hampshire
- James Leeper Johnson (1818–1877), U.S. congressman from Kentucky
- James M. Johnson (judge), justice of the Washington Supreme Court
- James M. Johnson (politician) (1832–1913), lieutenant governor of Arkansas
- James Paul Johnson (born 1930), U.S. congressman from Colorado
- James Johnson (Manitoba politician) (1855–1929), politician in Manitoba, Canada
- James Johnson (Delaware politician) or "J.J." (born 1943), member of the Delaware House of Representatives
- Mike Johnson (James Michael Johnson, born 1972), Speaker of the U.S. House of Representatives

== Sportspeople ==
=== American football ===
- James Johnson (linebacker) (born 1962), American football player
- James Johnson (running back) (born 1984), former running back for the Minnesota Vikings
- James Johnson (Canadian football) (born 1980), professional American football and Canadian football cornerback
- James-Michael Johnson (born 1989), American football player
- Jim Johnson (coach) (James Archie Johnson Jr., 1912–2004), American football, basketball, and baseball player, coach, and college athletics administrator
- J. J. Johnson (American football) (James E. Johnson Jr., born 1974), former running back for the Miami Dolphins, 1998 winner of the Conerly Trophy

=== Baseball ===
- Jim Johnson (baseball, born 1945) (James Brian Johnson, 1945–1987), American baseball pitcher (1967–1970) and briefly a member of 1970 San Francisco Giants
- Jim Johnson (baseball, born 1983) (James Robert Johnson), pitcher for the Atlanta Braves

=== Other sports ===
- James Johnson (sprinter), American track and field sprinter of the 1960s
- James Johnson (sprinter, born 1912), American sprinter, runner-up in the 100 m and 200 m at the 1933 USA Outdoor Track and Field Championships
- James Johnson (wrestler, born 1954), American Greco-Roman Olympic wrestler
- James Johnson (wrestler, born 1957) (1957–2019), American Greco-Roman wrestler and coach
- James Johnson (basketball, born 1971), former head coach of the Virginia Tech Hokies men's basketball team
- James Johnson (basketball, born 1987), basketball player for the Indiana Pacers
- James Johnson (cricketer) (born 1998), English cricketer
- James Johnson (sports administrator), Australian sports administrator and businessman
- James H. Johnson (figure skater) (1874–1921), British silver medalist in pairs figure skating at the 1908 Summer Olympics
- Jim Johnson (footballer) (James Johnson, 1923–1987), English footballer for Grimsby Town and Carlisle United
- Jim Johnson (ice hockey, born 1962) (James Erik Johnson), former ice hockey player in the National Hockey League
- Jim Johnson (rugby league) (James Joseph Johnson, 1881–1956), New Zealand international rugby league player
- Jim Johnson (athletic director) (James R. Johnson), current athletics director in the NCAA Division II
- Jim Johnson (ice hockey, born 1942) (Norman James Johnson, 1942–2021), ice hockey player in the National Hockey League and World Hockey Association

== Others ==
- James Johnson (Master of Sidney Sussex College, Cambridge) (1640–1704), Master of Sidney Sussex 1688–1704
- James Johnson (surgeon) (1777–1845), British surgeon, writer and editor
- James Johnson (assistant bishop of Western Equatorial Africa) (1836–1917), Sierra Leone Creole Anglican bishop
- James Johnson (bishop of Worcester) (1705–1774), English prelate, Bishop of Gloucester (1752–59) and Worcester (1759–74)
- James Johnson (bishop of St Helena) (1926-2022), English prelate, Bishop of St Helena (1985–91)
- James Johnson (railway engineer), locomotive superintendent of the Great North of Scotland Railway, 1890–1894
- James A. Johnson (architect) (1865–1939), American architect
- James Hervey Johnson (1901–1988), American atheist
- James Wood Johnson (1856–1932), co-founder of the company Johnson and Johnson
- James Yate Johnson (1820–1900), English naturalist
- President James Johnson (Metal Gear), the fictional 44th President of the United States in Metal Gear Solid 2: Sons of Liberty
- James Johnson, sole survivor of the wreck of the Dunbar

== See also ==
- Jimmy Johnson (disambiguation)
- James Johnston (disambiguation)
- Jamie Johnson (disambiguation)
- James Johnstone (disambiguation)
