= Jim Johnson =

Jim, Jimmy, or Jimmie Johnson may refer to:

== Sports ==
=== American football ===
- Jim Johnson (coach) (1912–2004), American football, basketball, and baseball player, coach
- Jim Johnson (American football) (1941–2009), NFL assistant coach most notably with the Philadelphia Eagles
- Jimmy Johnson (quarterback) (1879–1942), American football player
- Jimmy Johnson (cornerback) (1938–2024), American football cornerback and hurdler
- Jimmy Johnson (American football coach) (born 1943), former college football and National Football League coach, and former television sports analyst
- Jimmie Johnson (American football) (born 1966), American football tight end

=== Baseball ===
- Jim Johnson (baseball, born 1945) (1945–1987), American baseball pitcher (1967–1970) and briefly a member of 1970 San Francisco Giants
- Jim Johnson (baseball, born 1983) (born 1983), American baseball relief pitcher
- Jimmy Johnson (pitcher) (1918–1987), American baseball pitcher in the Negro leagues and Mexican League
- Jimmy Johnson (1930s shortstop), American baseball shortstop in the Negro leagues
- Jimmy Johnson (1940s shortstop), American baseball shortstop in the Mexican League and Negro leagues
- Jimmy Johnson (baseball, born 1947), minor league baseball player, coach and manager

=== Other sports ===
- Jim Johnson (rugby league) (1881–1956), New Zealand international
- Jim Johnson (boxer) (1887–1918), or Battling Jim Johnson, early 20th century heavyweight
- Jim Johnson (footballer, born 1923) (1923–1987), English footballer for Grimsby Town and Carlisle United
- Jim Johnson (jockey) (1929–2021), Australian jockey, remembered primarily for winning the Melbourne Cup
- Jim Johnson (ice hockey, born 1942) (1942–2021), forward for the Philadelphia Flyers and Minnesota Fighting Saints
- Jim Johnson (ice hockey, born 1962), defenceman for the Pittsburgh Penguins and Minnesota North Stars
- Jim Johnson (athletic director), current athletics director in the NCAA Division II
- Jimmie Johnson (born 1975), professional American auto racing driver

== Music ==
- Jimmy Johnson (session guitarist) (1943–2019), American guitarist and producer from Alabama
- Jimmy Johnson (blues guitarist) (1928–2022), American blues guitarist from Mississippi
- Jimmy Johnson (rapper), member of Prime Boys
- Jimmy Johnson (bassist) (born 1956), American bass guitarist best known for his work with James Taylor

== Entertainment ==
- Jim Johnson (radio) (1945–2025), Chicago radio personality
- Jimmy Johnson (actor) (died 2020), Nigerian actor
- Jimmy Johnson (cartoonist), creator of Arlo and Janis

== Other ==
- Jim Johnson (British Army officer) (1924–2008)
- James Paul Johnson (1930–2025), known as Jim, U.S. Representative from Colorado
- Jim Johnson (New Jersey politician) (born 1960), New Jersey–based activist and politician
- Jimmy Johnson, a character in the TV series Silk

== See also ==
- Jim Jonsin, American music producer
- Jim Johnston (disambiguation)
- Jimmy Johnstone (1944–2006), Scottish footballer
- James Johnson (disambiguation)
