= James A. Johnson =

James A. Johnson may refer to:

- James A. Johnson (California politician) (1829–1896), American politician and Californian Lieutenant Governor
- James A. Johnson (architect) (1865–1939), American architect
- James Allen Johnson (1924–2016), United States Army major general
- James A. Johnson (businessman) (1943–2020), American businessman and Democratic Party political figure
- James Austin Johnson (born 1989), American comedian & actor, Saturday Night Live cast member

== See also ==
- James A. C. Johnson (1867–1937), mayor of Englewood, New Jersey
- James Johnson (disambiguation)
