= James Johnston =

James or Jim Johnston may refer to:

== Politics ==
- James Johnston (secretary of state) (1655–1737), Scottish secretary of state
- James William Johnston (1792–1873), Canadian politician and judge
- James Johnston (MP) (1801–1841), MP for Stirling Burghs 1830–32
- James Johnston (Upper Canada politician) (died 1849), Bytown businessman and politician
- James Johnston (Australian politician) (1811–1896), businessman and politician in Victoria, Australia
- James Johnston (New South Wales politician) (1854–1930), politician in New South Wales, Australia
- James Johnston (Queensland politician) (c. 1820–1875), member of the Queensland Legislative Assembly
- James Johnston (Northern Ireland politician) (1849–1924), Member of the Senate of Northern Ireland
- James Johnston (Seanad Éireann member), member of Seanad Éireann 1938–48
- James T. Johnston (1839–1904), U.S. representative from Indiana
- James Wellwood Johnston (1900–1958), British politician
- James Johnston (socialist politician) (1846–1928), British co-operative and socialist activist
- James Roger Johnston (1930–2020), politician in Victoria, Australia

== Military ==
- James Johnston (British Army officer, born 1721) (1721–1795), British Army general in the Royal Horse Guards
- James Johnston (British Army officer, died 1797) (c. 1721 – 1797), British Army general
- James Johnston (British Army officer, born 1911) (1911–1988), British Army officer in the Royal Army Medical Corps
- James D. Johnston, Confederate Navy commander
- James Johnston (colonel) (1742–1805), American soldier and member of the North Carolina Provincial Congress

== Business ==
- James Johnston (brewer) (1818–1891), South Australian brewer
- James Johnston (merchant) (1720s–1800), Canadian merchant
- James A. Johnston (1874–1954), warden at Alcatraz prison
- James P. Johnston (1813–1879), California pioneer, built James Johnston House (Half Moon Bay, California)
- James Robinson Johnston (1876–1915), Canadian lawyer and community leader
- James Johnston (publisher) (1738–1808), Scottish publisher

== Scientists ==
- James Finlay Weir Johnston (1796–1855), Scottish chemist
- James T. Johnston (born 1997), aeronautical engineer
- Jim Johnston (chemist) (born 1949), New Zealand chemist who won the 1998 Thomson Medal

== Religion ==
- James S. Johnston (1843–1924), Episcopal bishop in America
- James Johnston (missionary) (1851–1921), British missionary, photographer and explorer
- James Vann Johnston Jr. (born 1959), American Roman Catholic bishop
- James Johnston (priest), Archdeacon of Gibraltar

== Arts ==
- Jim Johnston (composer) (born 1952), American composer of professional wrestling entrance themes
- Jim Johnston (director) (1936–2023), American television director
- James Johnston (tenor) (1903–1991), Northern Irish opera singer
- James Johnston (English musician) (born 1966), English alternative rock musician
- James Johnston (Scottish musician) (born 1980), bassist of Biffy Clyro
- Jamie Johnston (born 1989), Canadian actor
- Jim Johnston (English musician), member of the Bristol band Monk & Canatella
- James Johnston (Australian musician), (born 26 November 1990) Australian country artist

== Sports ==
- James Johnston (baseball owner) (1895–1967), co-owner of the Washington Senators of the American League
- James Johnston (footballer, born 1866) (1866–1952), Scottish footballer for Abercorn and Scotland
- James Johnston (1900s footballer) (fl. 1900s), Scottish footballer for Third Lanark
- James Johnston (rugby union) (born 1986), Samoan rugby union player
- James J. Johnston (1875–1946), English boxing promoter and manager
- Jimmy Johnston (American football) (1917–1973), American football player
- Jim Johnston (pole vaulter), co-winner of the 1958 NCAA DI outdoor pole vault championship

== Other ==
- James Johnston (murderer) (1856–1891), Australian murderer who killed his wife and four children

== See also ==
- Don Johnston (Donald James Johnston), former Canadian politician and the Secretary General of the OECD
- James Johnstone (disambiguation)
- James Johnson (disambiguation)
- James Howard-Johnston (born 1942), English historian
