= Thomas Burke =

Thomas Burke or Tom Burke may refer to:

== Artists and entertainers ==
- Thomas Burke (artist) (1749–1815), Irish engraver and painter known for mezzotint
- Thomas Burke (author) (1886–1945), English poet and author
- Thomas Burke (tenor) (1890–1969), British operatic tenor
- Tom Burke (actor) (born 1981), English actor

== Clergymen ==
- Thomas Burke (bishop) (circa 1709–1776), Irish Roman Catholic clergyman
- Thomas Nicholas Burke (1830–1882), Irish Roman Catholic theologian and preacher
- Thomas Martin Aloysius Burke (1840–1915), Irish-born Roman Catholic clergyman
- Tom Burke (priest) (1923–2008), Irish Carmelite priest, physicist and schoolteacher

== Politicians and government officials ==
- Thomas Burke (Clare politician) (1876–1951), Irish legislator
- Thomas Burke (North Carolina politician) (c. 1747–1783), Irish-born physician, lawyer and politician
- Sir Thomas Burke, 3rd Baronet (1813–1875), Irish legislator
- Thomas A. Burke (1898–1971), American Democratic city executive and legislator
- Thomas Henry Burke (civil servant) (1829–1882), Irish Catholic Permanent Under Secretary in Britain's Irish Office
- Thomas Henry Burke (politician) (1904–1959), American politician
- Tom Burke (Australian politician) (1910–1973), Labor Party legislator for the Division of Perth
- Sir Thomas Kerry Burke (born 1942), New Zealand Labour Party Member of Parliament
- T. J. Burke (Thomas James Burke, born 1972), American-born Canadian legislator

== Sportsmen ==
- Tom Burke (footballer, born 1862) (1862–1914), Welsh footballer
- Tom Burke (hurler) (fl. 1865–1887), Irish hurler
- Thomas Burke (sprinter) (1875–1929), American sprinter, first Olympic champion in the 100 m and 400 m races
- Tom Burke (American football) (born 1976), American National Football League player
- Tom Burke (Irish footballer), Ireland footballer

== Soldiers ==
- Thomas Burke (Medal of Honor sailor) (1833–1883), U.S. Navy sailor and peacetime Medal of Honor recipient
- Thomas Burke (Medal of Honor soldier) (1842–1902), Medal of Honor recipient
- Tom Burke (RAF officer), British senior Royal Air Force air vice-marshal

== Others ==
- Thomas Burke (businessman) (1870–1949), Australian businessman and philanthropist
- Thomas Burke (railroad builder) (1849–1925), American jurist and railroad builder
- Thomas E. Burke (1864–1941), Irish-born American labor union leader
- Thomas J. Burke (North Dakota judge) (1896–1966), American jurist; justice of North Dakota Supreme Court
- Thomas Ulick Burke (1826–1867), bank manager and victim of the Break-o-Day murder in gold-rush Victoria
- Tom Burke (environmentalist) (born 1938), British academic and writer on environmental policy issues
- Tom Burke (Irish revolutionary and sportsman) (1894–1967), Irish revolutionary, sportsman and referee
- William Burke (pirate) (died 1699), sometimes known as Thomas Burke, Irish pirate active in the Caribbean, associate of William Kidd

== Fictional characters ==
- Thomas Burke, in the video game Mafia III
- Officer Thomas Burke, in the movie Final Destination 2.

== See also ==
- Tomás Burke (fl. 1600–02), Irish gentleman and soldier
- Burke (surname)
- Tommy Burks (1940–1998), American Democratic legislator in Tennessee
