= Nemo Design =

American brand design agency

- Founded: 1999
- Founders: Jeff Bartel; Trevor Graves; Chris Hotz
- Headquarters: 1875 SE Belmont Street, Portland, Oregon, U.S.
- Revenue: $8.2 million (2014)
- Number of employees: 38 (2015)

Nemo Design is a brand design agency and creative workshop based in Portland, Oregon, in the United States. The company was established by Jeff Bartel, a snowboarding photographer Trevor Graves, and by Chris Hotz in 1999. It offers a variety of services, specializing in active lifestyle and culture brands.

== Description and history ==
Nemo Design is a brand design agency and creative workshop based in Portland, Oregon, offering a variety of services and specializing in active lifestyle and culture brands. The company was established by Jeff Bartel, snowboarding photographer Trevor Graves, and Chris Hotz in 1999, after they were laid off at Morrow Snowboards following its acquisition by K2 Skis. Bartel, formerly Morrow's art director, is a longtime graphic designer for snowboards. The trio named the company "Nemo", which means "no one" in Latin, because they wanted a more collective culture and thought using their surnames would give the unwanted impression of a law firm.

According to Transworld Skateboarding, "[Nemo's] curiosity and desire to create has pushed them to bridge the gap between print, product graphics, consulting, packaging, motion graphics, photography, and web design." The company has been located at 1875 Southeast Belmont Street, in Portland's Buckman neighborhood, since c. 2004. In 2008, the agency brought on Mark Lewman as a partner and creative director. Hotz left Nemo in the early 2010s, leaving Bartel, Graves, and Lewman as the three principals. Bartel and Graves continue to serve as executive art director and president, respectively. By August 2015, the agency had 38 employees.

=== Culture and events ===
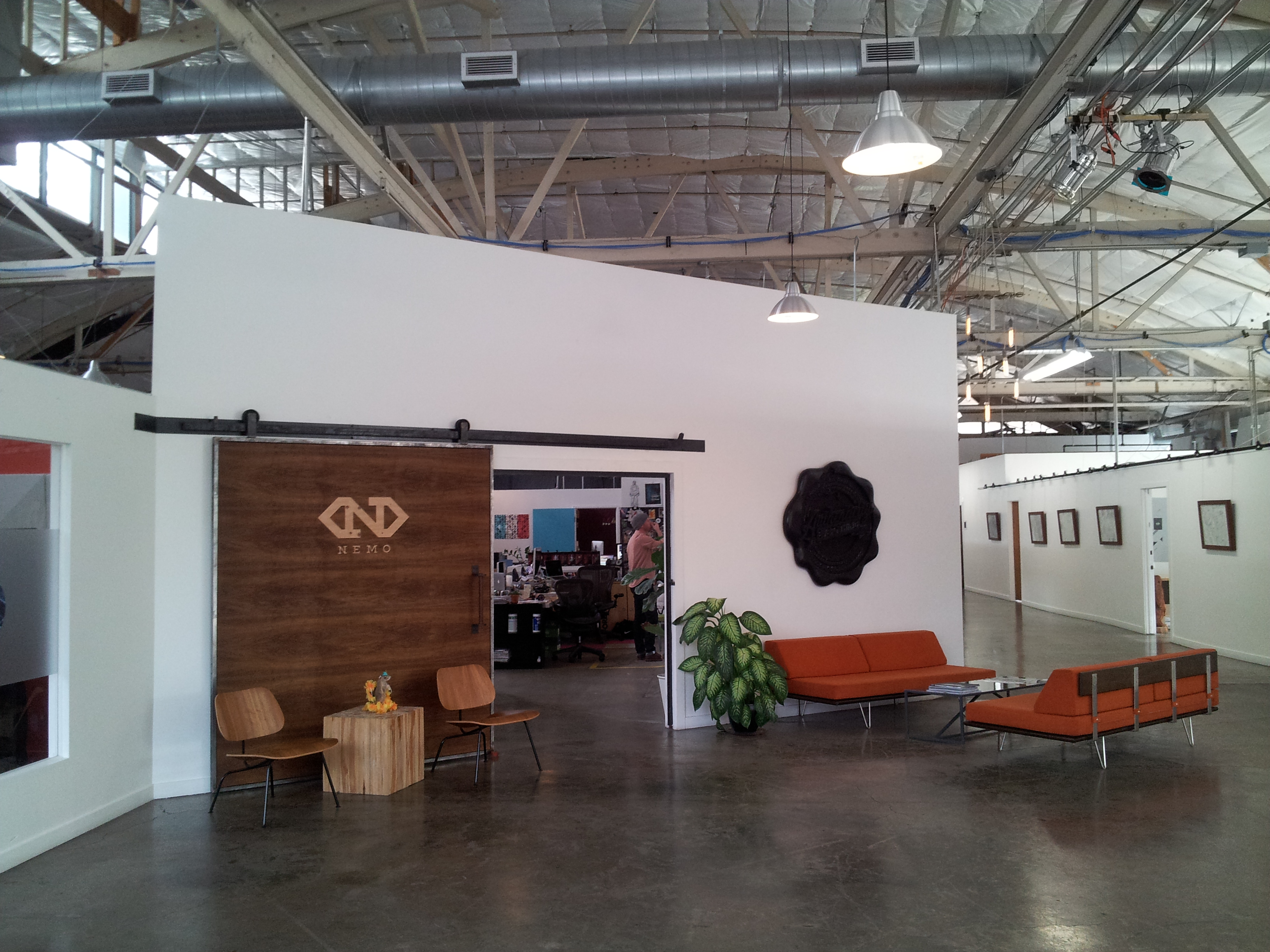
Interior of Nemo's office space

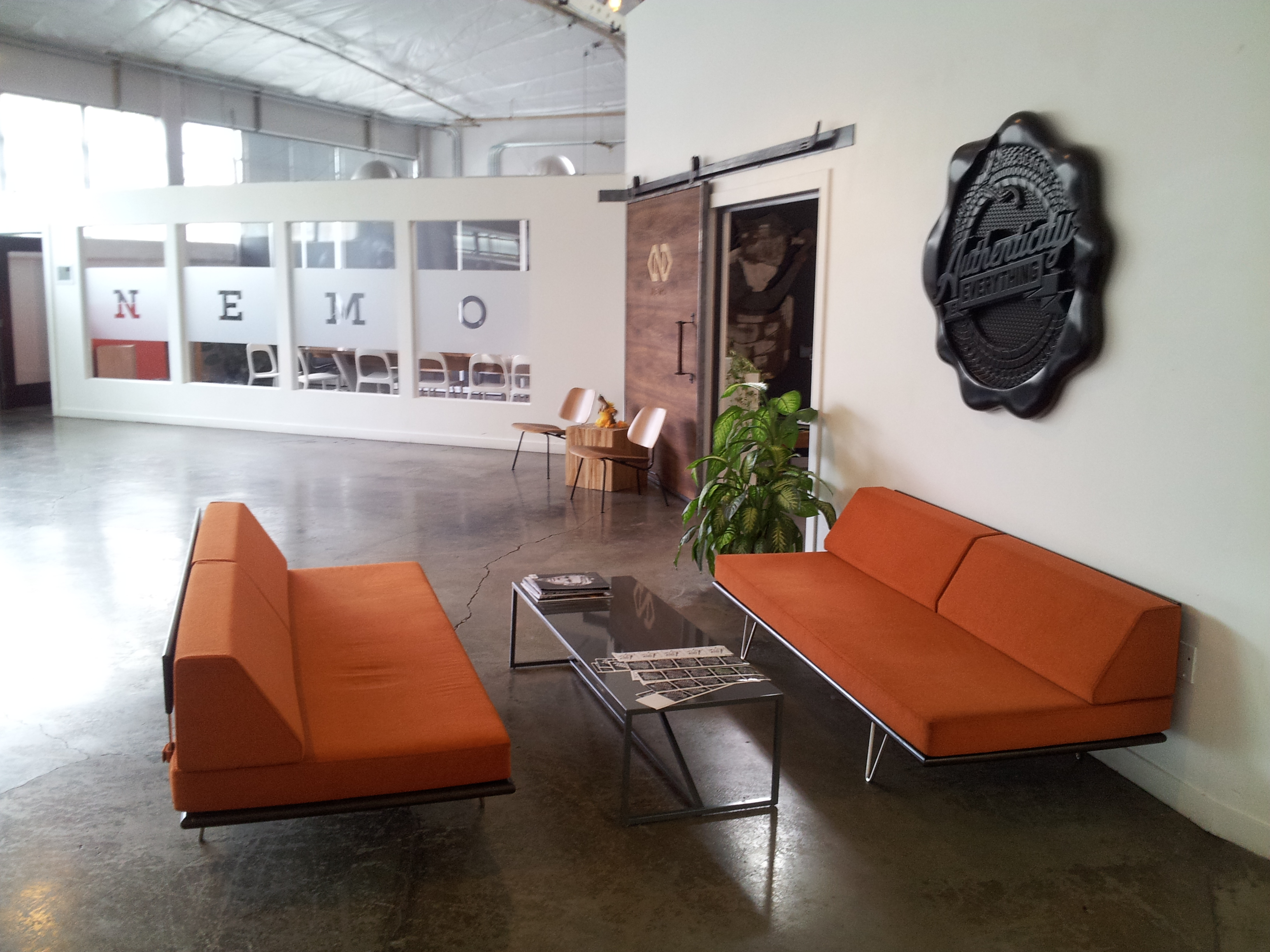
Nemo's lobby, 2015

According to Lewman, Nemo strives for "collective progression" and operates in the belief that "we're stronger together than as individuals". He has also said of the company's culture, "We want to feel like we're on summer vacation. We work really hard, but it should be for something fun and rewarding. It's like the Mark Twain quote: 'If it feels like play, it's not really work.'" Nemo offers "Skateboard Wednesdays" (also known as "Nemo Nooners") as an employee benefit, spending $300 per month to rent out the Commonwealth Skateboarding Park for personnel and their friends for three hours each week. In addition, the firm provides evening access to a company boat housed along the Willamette River. It also offers more traditional benefits like 401(k) matching and health insurance. Nemo has hosted a variety of events in their office space, including art shows, forums and panel discussions, fundraisers, and photography exhibits.

In 2008, the regional chapter of the National Academy of Recording Arts and Sciences hosted "PDX in the Mix" at Nemo. The panel featured Tucker Martine and Portia Sabin, among others, and was moderated by English musician Dave Allen (Gang of Four, Shriekback), who has served as Nemo's Director of Insights and Digital Media. Nemo hosted "I Am Snowboarding", a traveling art show, in 2010. More than 500 people visited the exhibit; a raffle featured snowboards and other products provided by Burton Snowboards, Lib Technologies, Skullcandy, Vans, and Volcom, among other companies. In December, the company hosted a screening of The Birth of Big Air, a film directed by Jeff Tremaine and co-produced by Lewman. Two-hundred BMX riders and Mat Hoffman fans attended the screening, which also served as a fundraise. It featured a collection of BMX bikes, courtesy of the BMX Museum, and an appearance by Hoffman.

In November 2014, Graves and Nemo hosted a benefit for snowboarding photographer Chris Brunkhart following his cancer diagnosis. The event included an auction of historical art and photography and raised more than $50,000 for Brunkhart and his family. The agency hosted an opening party for the 2015 "Everything Is Festival", a 4-day popular culture event billed as "the world's most completely indefinable festival of fun". Nemo has also hosted in its office space a happy hour organized by the women of Studio Co/Create, plus events associated with Design Week Portland.

== Clients ==
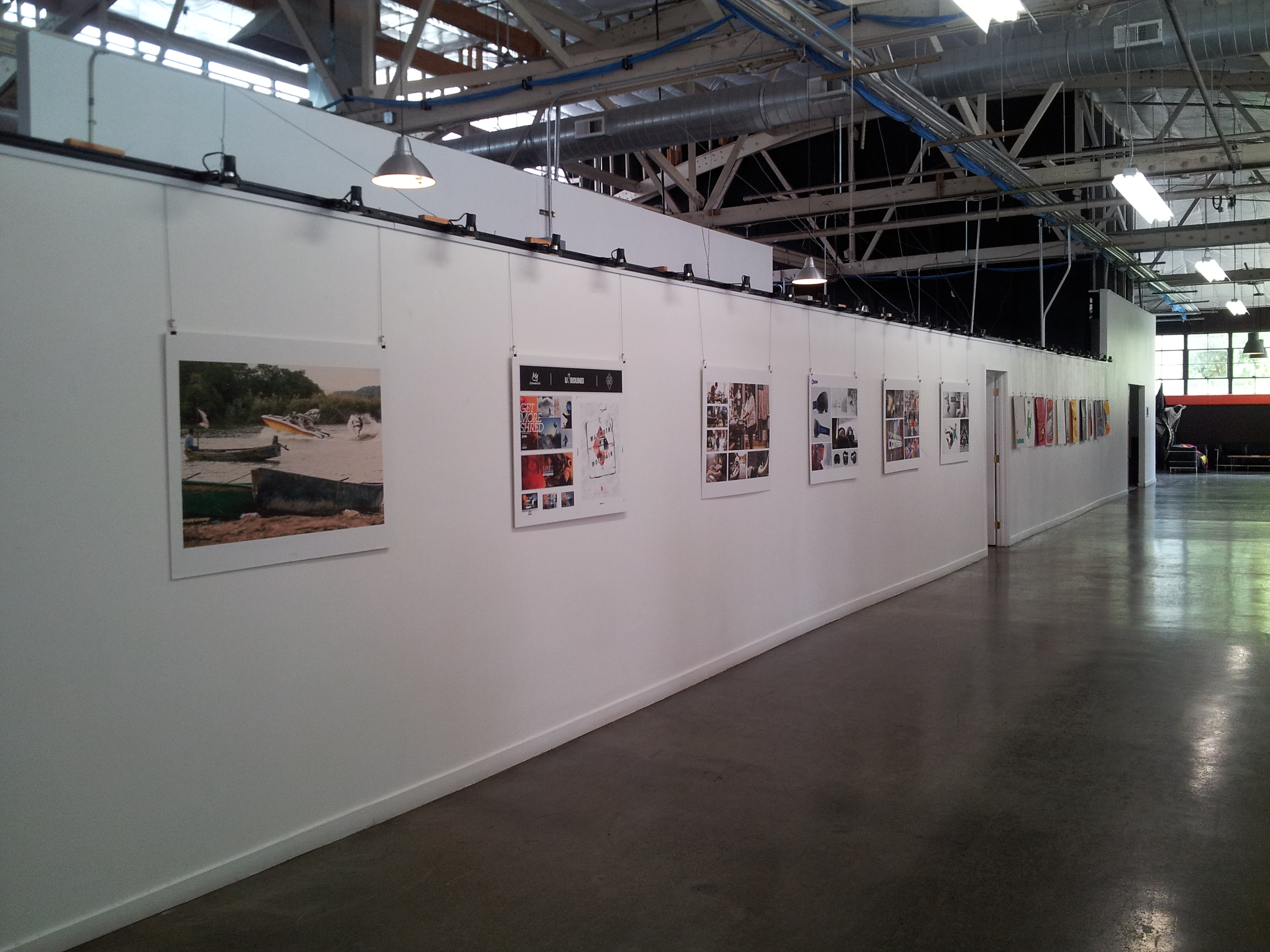
Gallery at Nemo's office space, showcasing work created for clients

Nike Inc. was one of Nemo's first clients. The agency worked with Nike's All Conditions Gear brand and Nike Skateboarding, which targeted the snowboarding and skateboarding industries, respectively. Nemo's early staff had experience with the snowboarding industry, based on their previous employer, and Graves was uniquely qualified because of his work as a snowboarding photographer. The agency later worked on the now-defunct Nike 6.0 action sports brand and continues to work with Nike. Adidas, American Eagle Outfitters, Eckō Unltd., and Robotfood were also early clients. In 2004, Smith Optics announced its partnership with Nemo to consult on branding and marketing strategies and design all of Smith's visuals, including advertisements, catalogs, and point of sale materials. In 2006, the collective Lobo confirmed its collaboration with Nemo on a three-spot television advertising campaign for NKE6, Nike's extreme sports brand. The animated, 15-second ads, which aired on MTV2 and Fuel TV, show the points of view of a skateboarder, snowboarder, and surfer.

Major clients have included Converse, Hewlett-Packard, JVC, Mammoth Mountain Ski Area, Mattel's Hot Wheels, and Oakley, Inc. In November 2013, Converse named Nemo its North American agency of record for retail after working together for six months. Previously, the show company handled retail responsibilities in-house. The two companies had collaborated on a Jack Purcell shoe using the hybrid name "Converse x Deus Ex Machina", for which Nemo created "retail elements" in Deus Ex Machina's Venice, California shop. Nemo helped Converse launch three shoes (Aerojam, Anarchy and Star Player Plus), branded as the CONS lifestyle sneaker collection, in Champs Sports, Foot Locker, and Footactions stores. According to Graves, around 25 percent of Nemo's business came from Converse after being named its agency of record; other clients at the time were Bell Helmets, Mammoth Mountain, MasterCraft, and Nike (SPARQ Training).

== Recognition ==
Nemo has been honored multiple times by the Davey Awards, which "provide winners with tools, details, and assistance to create high-impact press releases and other useful communications touting their achievement". Nemo earned awards for their "Smith Motorcross Catalog" and "Smith Optics Brand Book", both created on behalf of Smith Optics. The company has received eight Davey Awards for entries related to Nike; recognized works include "Nike Rockstar Workout Hip", "Hips", "Hips & Lips", "Hogtide", "Lips", "Nike 360 PR Kit", "Nike 6.0 Press Kit", and the Nike 6.0 website.

The agency has also been recognized multiple times by the Portland Advertising Federation's Rosey Awards, which honor the best creative work in Oregon. In 2006, the company was recognized for their online advertising and sales kits for Nike. In 2007, Nemo earned three of nine awards at the 50th annual Rosey Awards in the categories "sales material/advertising poster", "advertising arts/illustration, single", and "advertising arts/illustration, series" for their Nike 6.0 campaigns called "The Compass", "Superball", and "Vertigo", respectively. In 2014, the Nemo-produced MasterCraft video "Mission 04: History Is History" earned Digital One, a post-production studio based in Portland, a Rosey in the audio category.

Nemo was included in Oregon Business' list of the "100 Best Green Companies to Work for in Oregon" in 2009. In 2013, the agency's "Fast Is Faster", created for Nike, was named a "Best of Division" winner in the category "Best of Packaging-Cartons and Containers" at the Print Rocks awards, which are presented annually by PPI, Pacific Printing Industries Association, and the Northwest's Visual Communications Industries Association, the latter of which covers the U.S. states of Alaska, Hawaii, Idaho, Montana, Oregon, and Washington. One designer affiliated with Nemo was recognized for a poster he designed for Portland's Doug Fir Lounge in Type Directors Club's (TDC) 2013 "Communication Design" competition. "Mission 04: History Is History" earned Nemo an AICP Award for Sound Design from the Association of Independent Commercial Producers in 2014. The Clio Awards, which have recognized creativity and high achievement in advertising since 1959, honored the agency for "Amazing Comes Standard", a catalog designed to showcase MasterCraft's equipment. Nemo received a bronze award in the category "Product/Service – Brochures, Calendars, Catalogs" in 2014. The company's brochure for MasterCraft was one of 152 projects (from 3,632 entries) recognized by a jury panel for Communication Arts' 2014 Design Annual.

In 2015, Nemo was named one of Advertising Age's small agencies of the year, earning a silver award in the category covering the Northwestern United States. Nemo ranked number seven in Outside's list of "The 100 Best Places to Work in 2015". The magazine also ranked Nemo number six on its list of "The Best Advertising Jobs". Outside noted access to the skate park and company boat as employee perks.
