= James Johnstone =

James, Jim, or Jimmy Johnstone may refer to:

== Law and politics ==
- Sir James Johnstone, 3rd Baronet (1697–1772), Scottish MP
- Sir James Johnstone, 4th Baronet (1726–1794), Scottish MP
- James Johnstone (1801–1888), Scottish MP

== Nobility ==
- James Johnstone, 1st Earl of Hartfell (1602–1653), Scottish peer
- James Johnstone, 2nd Marquess of Annandale (c. 1687–1730), Scottish peer
- James Hope-Johnstone, 3rd Earl of Hopetoun (1741–1816), Scottish peer

== Sports ==
- Jim Johnstone (umpire) (1872–1927), American baseball umpire
- Jimmy Johnstone (1944–2006), Scottish footballer
- Jim Johnstone (basketball) (born 1960), American basketball player
- James Johnstone (rugby union) (born 1990), Scottish rugby union player

== Others ==
- Chevalier de Johnstone (James Johnstone, 1719–c. 1791), Scottish Jacobite army officer
- James Johnstone (antiquary) (died 1798), Scandinavian antiquarian
- James Johnstone (physician) (1730?–1802), Scottish physician
- James Johnstone (explorer) (1759–1823), British naval officer and explorer
- James Johnstone (publisher) (1815–1878), British newspaper proprietor
- James Johnstone (stock breeder) (1859–1933), New Zealand businessman and stock breeder
- James Johnstone (biologist) (1870–1932), British biologist and oceanographer
- Jim Johnstone (poet) (born 1978), Canadian physiologist and poet

== See also ==
- James Johnston (disambiguation)
- James Johnson (disambiguation)
