= Jamie Johnson =

Jamie Johnson may refer to:

- Jamie Johnson (filmmaker) (born 1979), American documentary film filmmaker
- Jamie Johnson (judoka) (born 1972), British judoka
- Jamie Johnson (born 1972), founding member of The Grascals
- Jamie Haskell or Jamie Johnson (born 1980), American curler
- Jamie Johnson (ice hockey) (born 1982), Canadian professional ice hockey player
- Jamie Johnson (politician), Missouri State Legislator
- Jamie Johnson (TV series), a BBC children's television series

== See also ==
- James Johnson (disambiguation)
- Jamey Johnson (born 1975), American Country music artist
- Jamie Johnston (born 1989), Canadian actor
