= Mervin Manufacturing =

American snowboard manufacturer

Mervin Manufacturing is an American snowboard manufacturer. Mervin is the parent company of Lib Technologies (aka Lib Tech), GNU Snowboards, Roxy Snowboards, and Bent Metal bindings. In the mid 1990s Mervin was also an OEM supplier for companies such as Canada's Luxury brand and for The Movement Snowboards.

Mervin was purchased by Quiksilver in 1997 and later sold to Altamont Capital in 2013. It manufactures its snowboards in Sequim, Washington.
