= Ballarat Gaol =

Heritage listed site in Victoria, Australia

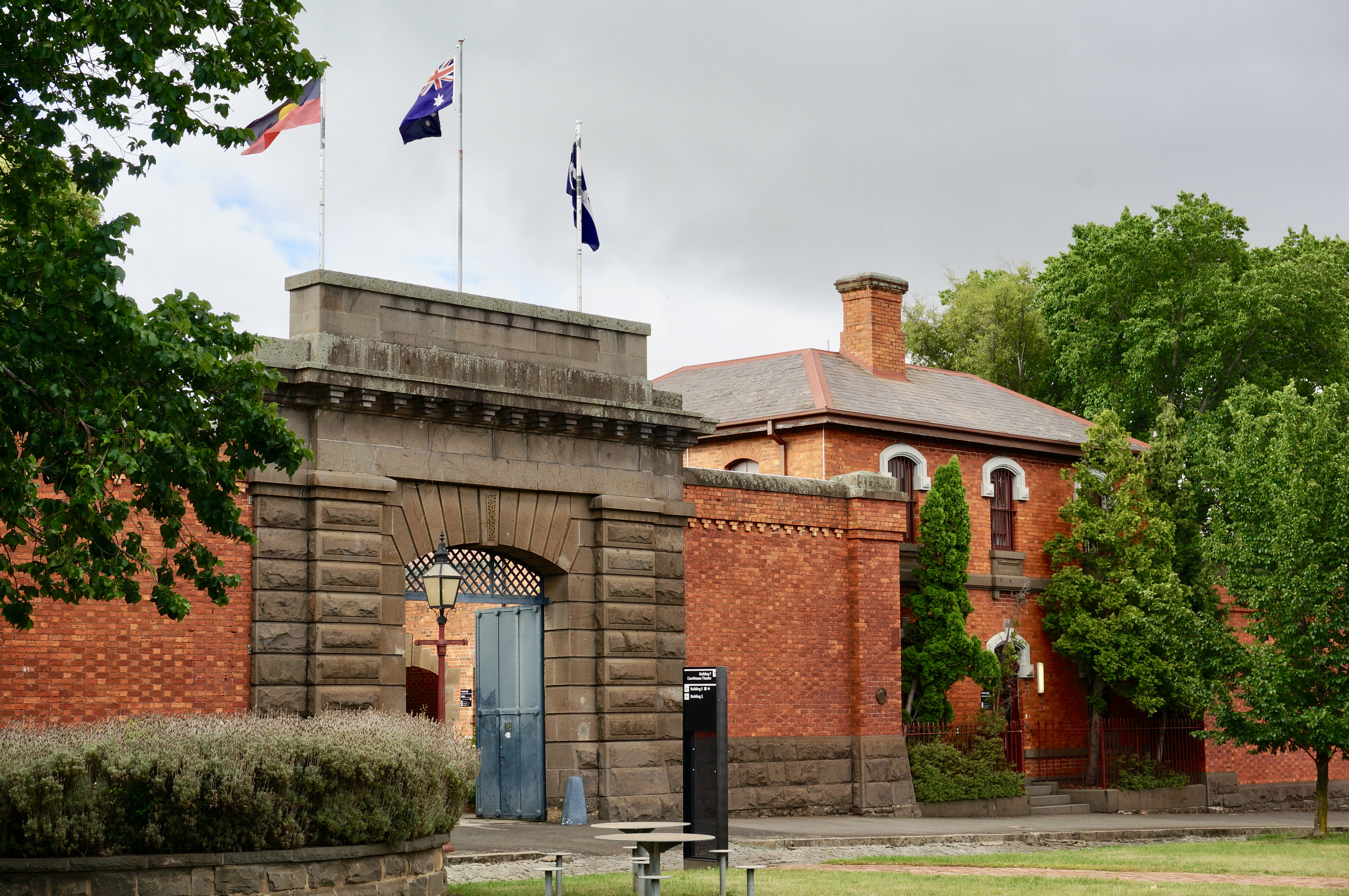
- Façade of the Ballarat Gaol
- Interactive map of Ballarat Gaol
- Location: Ballarat, Victoria; 37°33′56.37″S 143°51′26.23″E
- Status: Closed
- Capacity: 74
- Opened: 1862
- Closed: 1965
- Managed by: Federation University Australia and the National Trust of Australia

The Ballarat Gaol, a former maximum security prison for males, females and children, is located in Ballarat, Victoria, Australia. Replacing temporary structures including prison hulks in the Bay of Port Phillip and holding yards in Ballarat, the jail operated between 1862 and 1965.

The remaining gate, gate house, and cloisters are now home to the Collaborative Research Centre in Australian History (CRCAH) of Federation University Australia.

== History and structure ==
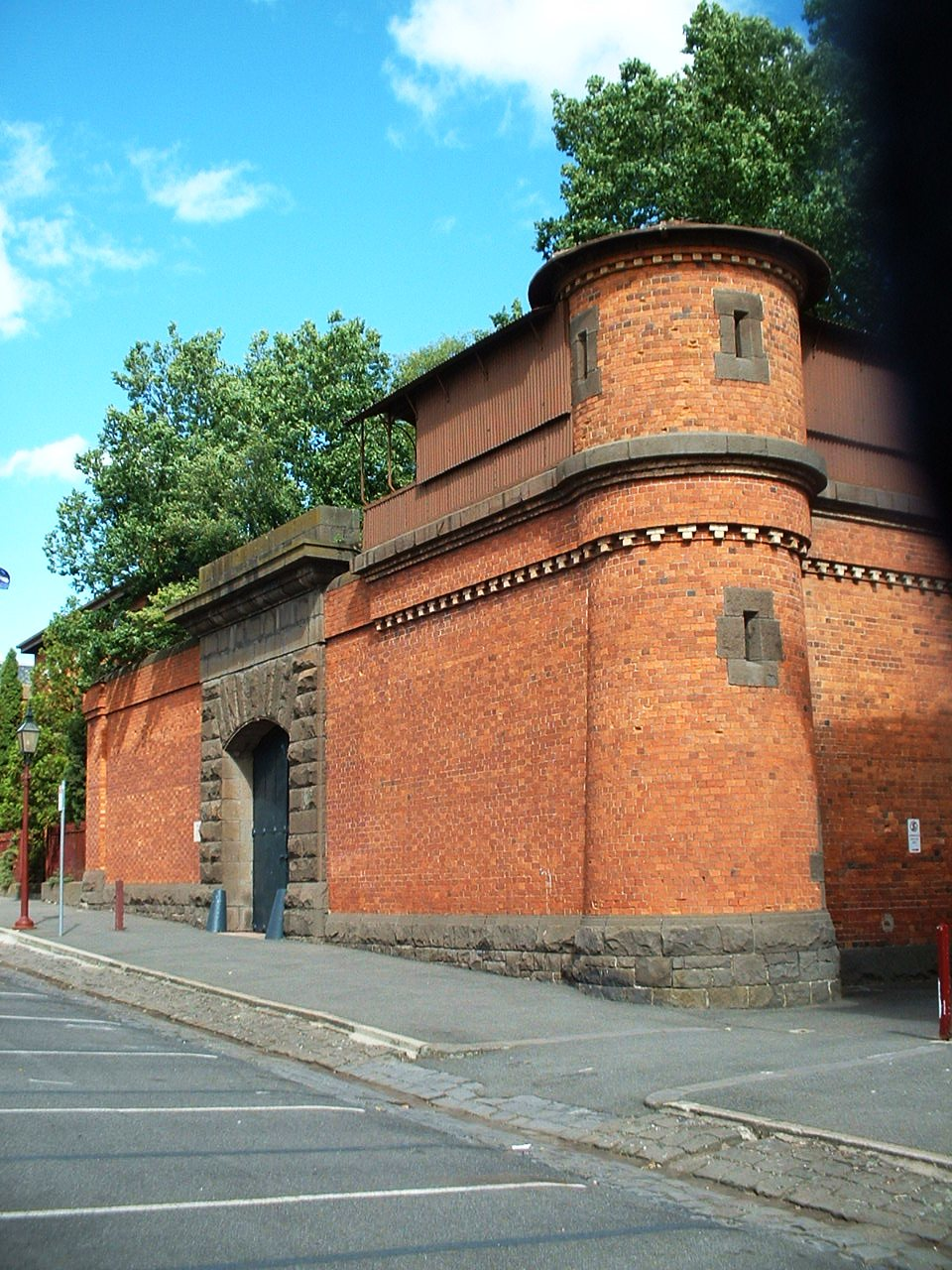
Remaining guard tower at the old Ballarat Gaol

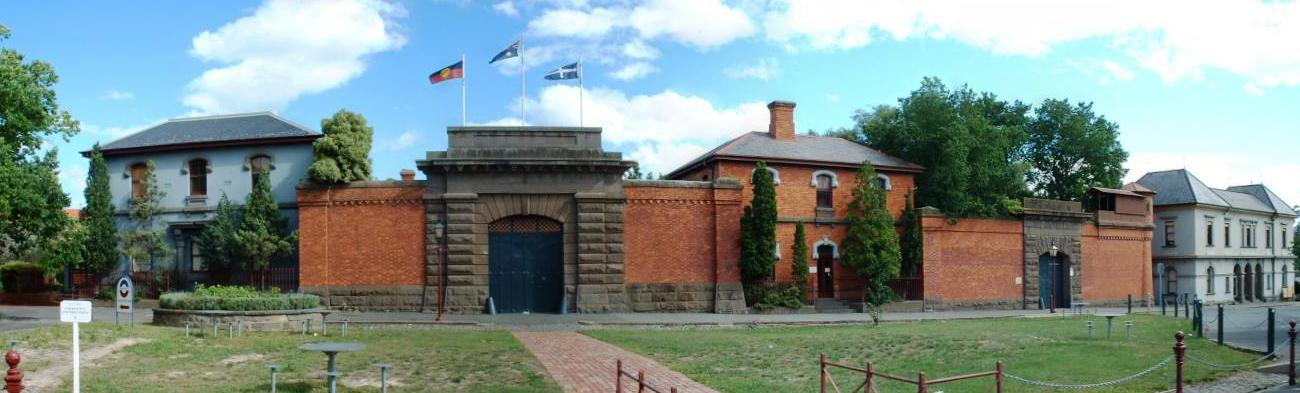
Panorama of Ballarat Gaol.

The report of the Select Committee on Prison Discipline of September 1857 recommended jail buildings replace the Port Phillip Bay prison hulks. The inquiry recommended adopting London's Pentonvillle design of 1842 to build the jails. This prison design carried on a revolution begun in 1829 by Eastern State Penitentiary in Philadelphia. The complex was based on a central hall from which radiated wings of cells. The principle of the design being that one guard would stand in the centre of the hall and at one glance survey all cells.

The construction of the jail began in 1856 and the first cell blocks were completed by 1857. It was completed in 1862 with 58 cells designed to hold a mixture of 74 male and female prisoners. In 1862 a tunnel was constructed to join the jail to the adjacent Ballarat Courthouse, allowing for the safe transfer of prisoners.

In 1872 Captain Moonlite, a bushranger and Anglican clergyman, escaped from the jail.

The prison was closed in 1965.

== Current use ==
Most of the jail was demolished to allow the School of Mines Ballarat to expand onto the site. The remaining structures at the site include the main gate, warden's residence and governor's residence. These buildings are now used by Federation University. The old warden's residence is now home to the Australian Centre for Research into Injury in Sports and its Prevention (ACRISP).

The site is listed on the Victorian Heritage Register.

== Executions ==
During its time in use as a jail, the following individuals were executed by hanging at Ballarat Gaol:

Name	Date of execution	Crime	Notes
Alexander Davis	1 March 1864	Murder of George Sims near Smythesdale	
James Jones	19 March 1866	Murder of Dr Saenger	
Denis Murphy	16 April 1867	Murder of Patrick Mara	
George Searle	7 August 1867	Murder of Thomas Burke	
Joseph Ballam	7 August 1867	Murder of Thomas Burke	
John Wilson	11 May 1891		
James Johnston	18 May 1891	Murder of his wife and four children	
Oscar Wallace	11 August 1873		
James Ashe	21 August 1875		
Charles Baker	3 September 1885	Attempted murder of policeman	
Cornelius Bourke	21 November 1891	Murder of his cellmate in Hamilton Gaol	
Elijah Cockroft	12 November 1894	Murder of his brother's fiancée, Fanny Mott, at Noradjuha, (near Natimuk)	
Charles Henry Deutschmann	28 June 1908	Murder of his wife at Dobie (near Ararat)	
