= Federation University Australia =

Dual-sector university in Victoria, Australia

Coordinates: 37.6265°S 143.892°E

- Coat of arms
- Former names: List: Antecedent institutions (1870–1976); Ballarat College of Advanced Education (1976–1990); Ballarat University College of the University of Melbourne (1990–1994); University of Ballarat (1994–2014)
- Motto: Dare to be Different
- Type: Public research university
- Established: 1870 (antecedent); 1994 (as university)
- Accreditation: TEQSA
- Academic affiliations: RUN; UA
- Budget: A$376.85 million (2023)
- Visitor: Governor of Victoria
- Chancellor: Terrence Moran
- Vice-Chancellor: Duncan Bentley
- Total staff: 1,798 (2023)
- Students: 18,481 (2023)
- Undergraduates: 9,325 (2023)
- Postgraduates: 2,146 coursework (2023); 283 research (2023)
- Other students: 5,428 (VET) (2023); 144 other (2023)
- Location: Ballarat, Melbourne, Churchill and Horsham, Victoria, Australia
- Campus: Urban and regional with multiple sites
- Colours: Blue
- Sporting affiliations: UniSport; EAEN; UBL
- Website: federation.edu.au

Federation University Australia (FedUni) is a public university based in Victoria, Australia. It is the modern descendant of the School of Mines Ballarat, established in 1870 as the fourth tertiary institution in Australia, which evolved to form the modern university as it is today. Formerly known as the University of Ballarat, it changed its name to Federation University in 2014 as it became a multi-campus institution with a strong presence both in Ballarat and across the state.

The university is a dual-sector institution that provides both higher and vocational education. It offers study programs in healthcare, education, computational science, engineering and various other fields including commerce, the arts and sciences. It also offers technical and further education (TAFE), a Doctor of Philosophy (PhD) and other research programs.

The university has a multi-campus presence in and around Ballarat, including the old School of Mines campus which is notable for its red brick buildings, and also has campuses in Berwick (Melbourne) and Horsham (Wimmera). In 2013, the university merged with Monash University's former Gippsland campus in Churchill, an amalgamation that was followed by its renaming to Federation University.

== History ==
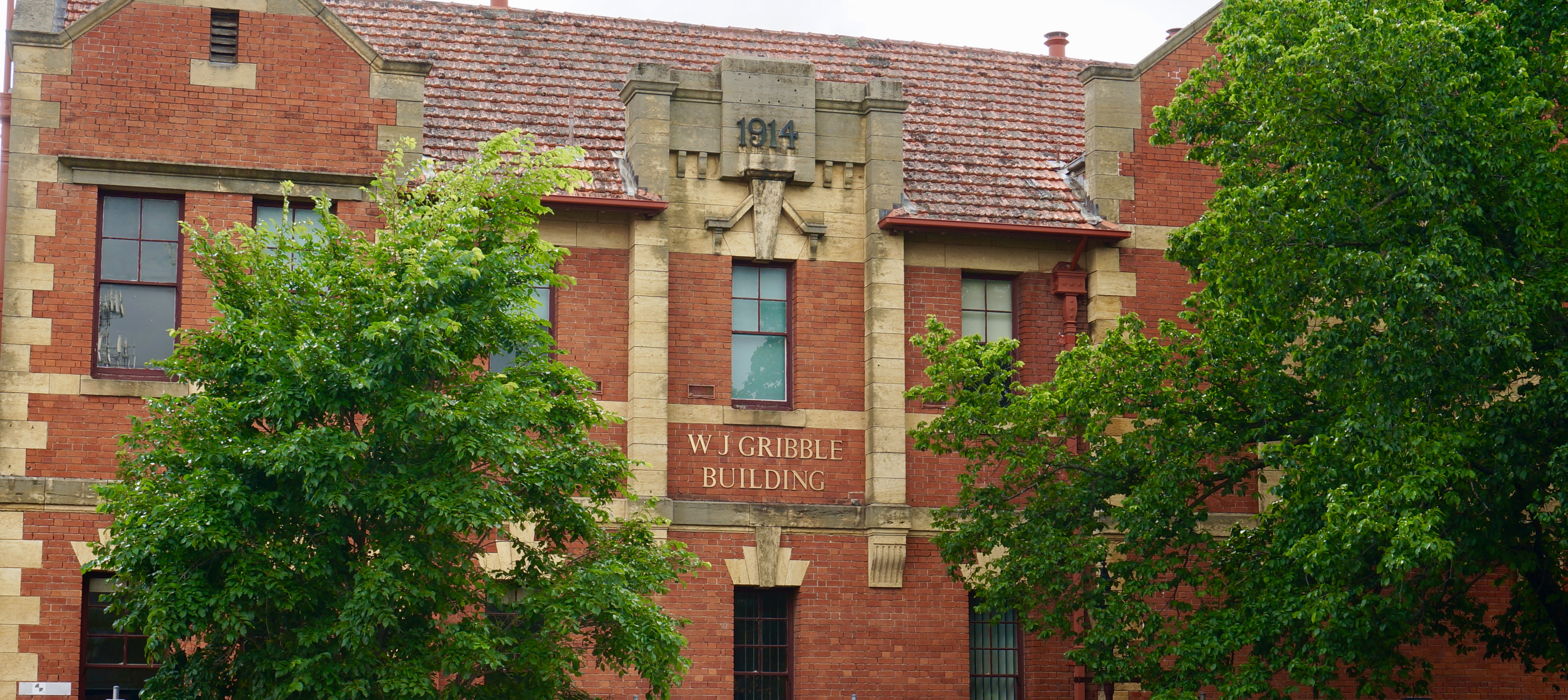
The historic SMB Campus on Lydiard Street.

=== 1870–2013 ===
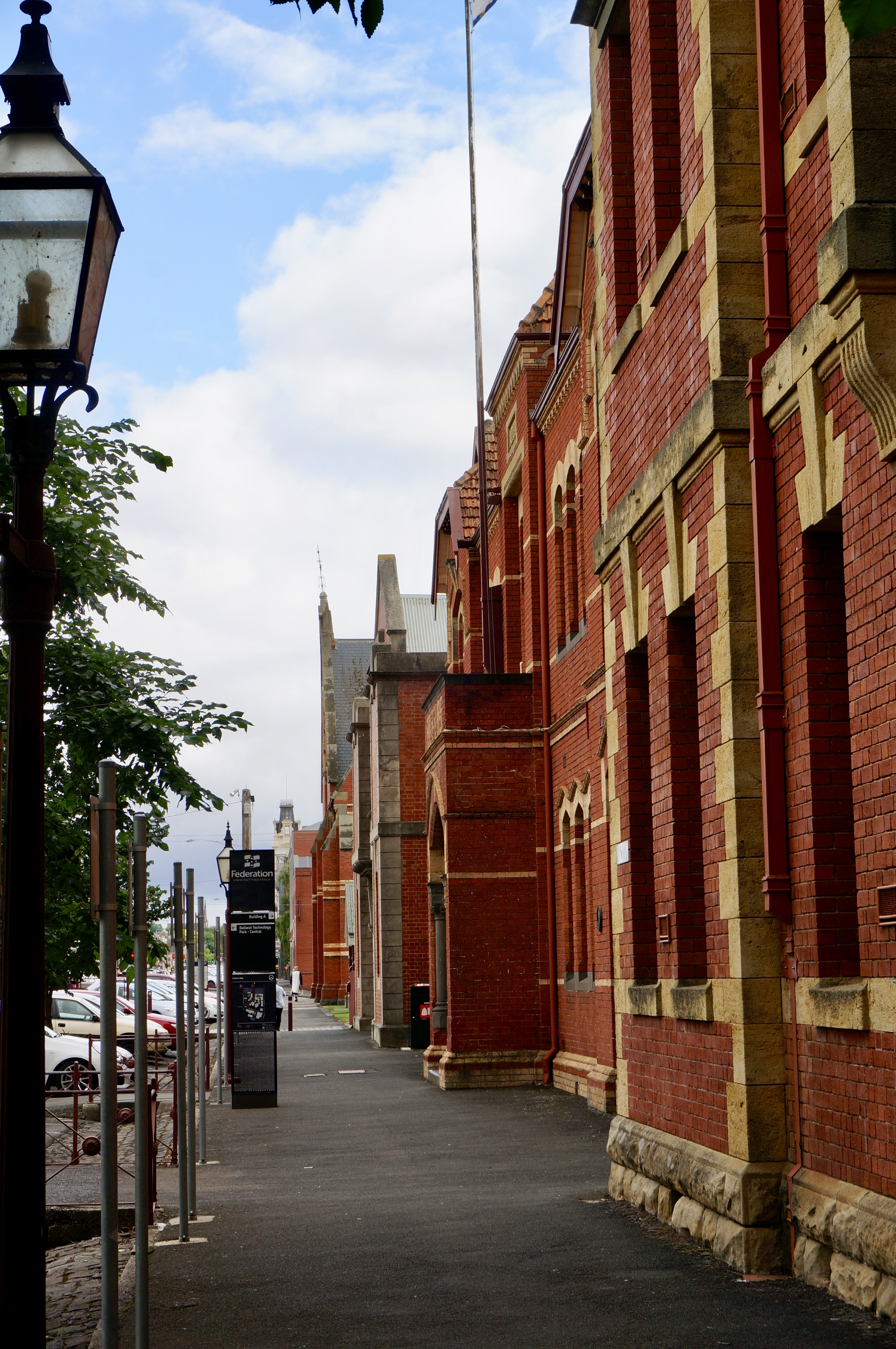
SMB Campus on Lydiard Street South.

Tertiary education at Ballarat began in 1870, making it Australia's fourth-oldest tertiary institution.

=== 2014–present ===
On 6 September 2013, the Victorian Parliament passed the University of Ballarat Amendment (Federation University Australia) Act 2013 (No. 50 of 2013) to establish Federation University Australia. The name change officially began in 2014. The then Vice-Chancellor justified the name change as an attempt to broaden the reach of the university nationally and internationally, and in fairness to the campuses outside Ballarat. Other names considered were Eureka University, Robert Menzies University, and Vida Goldstein University and several others, before narrowing down the choice to two names: State University of Victoria or Federation University Australia. After consultation with the community and over 100 stakeholders, the present name was decided upon.

== Campuses and buildings ==
In addition to the following campuses, the university also had joint-degree programmes with international colleges, including PLK Vicwood KT Chong Sixth Form College in Hong Kong.

=== Ballarat ===
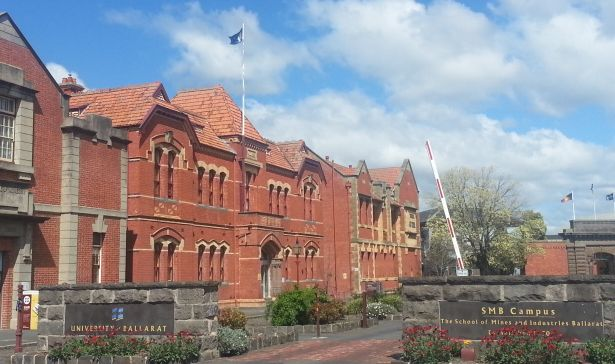
SMB campus is set among the heritage buildings of Lydiard Street Sth including the former School of Mines and Industry (left), former Supreme Court and former Ballarat Gaol (rear)

- Camp Street Campus – located in central Ballarat, this campus houses the Arts Academy. The campus consists of the Old General Post Office Building, the Old Courthouse, and several newer buildings which were completed in 2002.
- SMB Campus – located in central Ballarat and incorporates the original School of Mines Ballarat and the Old Ballarat Gaol. The campus offers training from certificate level through to advanced diploma and degree-level study.

==== Buildings and architecture ====
The former Ballarat Gaol, a maximum security prison that operated from 1862 until 1965, was located on the site of the university's School of Mines (SMB) campus, at the southern end of Lydiard Street. The area is known for being a well preserved Victorian era street. While the prison was mostly demolished in the 1960s, the old prison walls, gate and guard towers, as well as the residences of the governor and warden, still exist. One of the bedrooms was used by Bella Guerin, who in 1883 became the first woman to graduate from an Australian university. The campus also includes the old School of Mines buildings.

=== Mt Helen Campus ===
Located in Mt Helen, 10 km south of Ballarat. The university's largest campus, it has three residences, Peter Lalor South Hall, Peter Lalor North Hall, and Bella Guerin Hall. Its programs include the Institute of Education, Arts and Community; Institute of Health and Wellbeing: Institute of Innovation, Science and Sustainability.

==== Technology park ====
The university has a technology park at its Mt Helen Campus with the mission to facilitate the development of technology-based companies or companies that benefit from the technological resources of the university. The following organisations operate in the park.

- Ambulance Victoria
- Country Fire Authority
- Emergency Services Telecommunications Authority (ESTA)
- Global Innovation Centre
- Greenhill Enterprise Centre
- IBM South East Asia
- IBM Regional Software Solutions Centre
- ID Research
- State Revenue Office

More than 1350 people are employed by tenants at the technology park and approximately half of those holding Federation University Australia qualifications. In 2008, IBM announced that it would expand its workforce with the construction of a new $10 million building on the park.

=== Wimmera Campus ===
Offers TAFE courses and a higher education course in nursing.

=== Gippsland Campus ===
The Gippsland Campus is located in the township of Churchill in the foothills of the Strzelecki Ranges. The campus is home to over 2,500 students and approximately 400 staff.

The campus was formerly Monash University, Gippsland Campus, but became part of Federation University Australia on 1 January 2014.

=== Berwick Campus ===
The Berwick Campus is located 40 km (25 mi) south-east of the Melbourne city centre. It transitioned itself from the Monash University, Berwick campus in 2017 and completed its transition in early 2018. The exact location of the building is 100 Clyde Road, Berwick. The university has four buildings named 901, 902, 903, and 930 as well as additional buildings for on-campus living. Nursing has the highest enrolment rate at the Berwick Campus, with a focus also on education courses, IT, and psychology.

=== Former Brisbane campus ===
The Brisbane Campus, situated in the centre of Brisbane city, offered a range of undergraduate and postgraduate programs in information technology, business and allied health. It closed in 2024 due to low enrolments.

== Academic profile ==
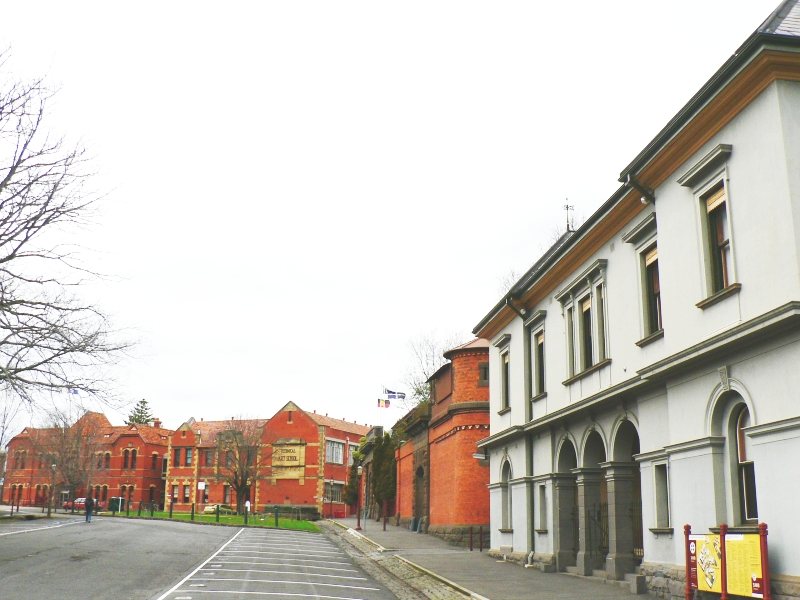
Heritage buildings and old Ballarat Gaol at the School of Mines and Industry. Lydiard Street, Ballarat CBD.

=== Undergraduate curriculum ===
Students can undertake undergraduate degrees across a wide range of study areas, which are:

- Humanities and social sciences
- Engineering
- Business
- Science and mathematics
- Education and early childhood
- Nursing, midwifery and paramedicine
- Psychology
- Performing arts
- Visual arts
- Information technology
- Occupational health and safety
- Sport, outdoor and physical education
- TAFE

=== Research divisions ===
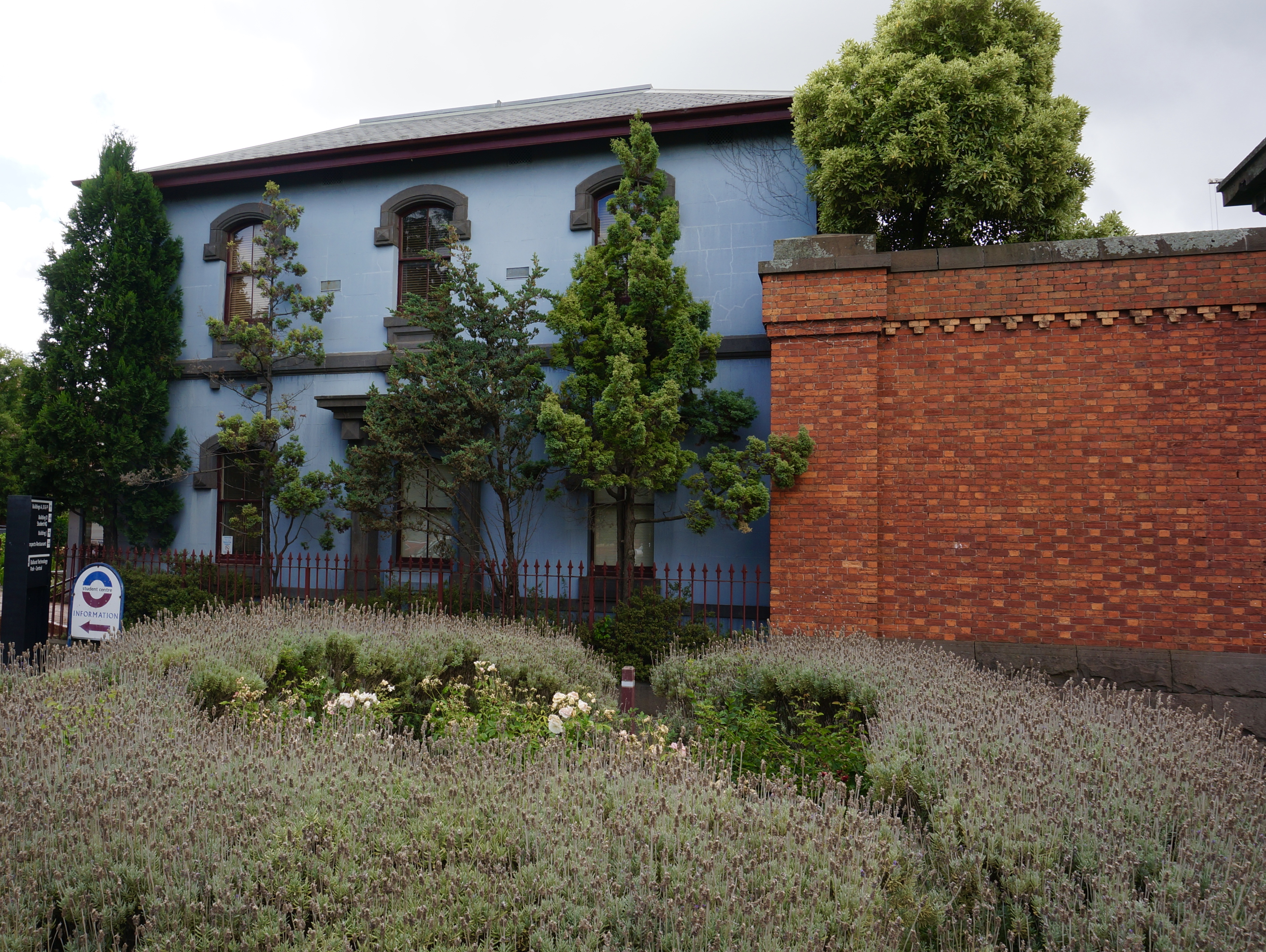
SMB Campus building, formerly Old Ballarat Gaol.

Researchers – academics and post-graduate students – undertake work within various centres, as well as within the disciplines. The research priority areas of the university are information forensics and security, transformative and preventative health, dynamic landscapes, history and heritage, and improving policy and practice in VET. The research centres are:

- Australian Retirement Research Institute (ARRI)
- Centre for Biopsychosocial and eHealth Research and Innovation (CBeRI)
- Centre for eResearch and Digital Innovation (CeRDI)
- Centre for Gippsland Studies (CGS)
- Centre for Informatics and Applied Optimisation (CIAO)
- Centre for Multimedia Computing, Communications, and Artificial Intelligence Research (MCCAIR)
- Geotechnical and Hydrogeological Engineering Research Group (GHERG)
- Researching Adult and Vocational Education (RAVE)
- Water Research Network
- Visiting Friends and Relatives Research
- Health Innovation and Transformation Centre
- Future Regions Research Centre
- Centre for Smart Analytics
- Centre for New Energy Transition Research
- Collaborative Evaluation and Research Group
- Geotechnical and Hydrogeological Engineering Research Group

There are also research facilities at Ballarat Technology Park, the Gippsland Enterprise Centre and Nanya Station in rural NSW.

=== Academic reputation ===
University rankings

Global – Overall
- THE World: 501–600 (2026)
- USNWR Global: =989 (25/26)

National – Overall
- ERA National: 36 (2018)
- THE National: 33–35 (2026)
- USNWR National: 34 (25/26)
- AFR National: =36 (2025)

National publications

In the Australian Financial Review Best Universities Ranking 2025, the university was tied #36 amongst Australian universities.

Global publications

In the Times Higher Education World University Rankings 2026 (published 2025), the university attained a position of #401–500 (33–35th nationally).

In the 2025–2026 U.S. News & World Report Best Global Universities, the university attained a tied position of #989 (34th nationally).

=== Student outcomes ===
The Australian Government's QILT (Note: Abbreviation for Quality Indicators for Learning and Teaching.) conducts national surveys documenting the student life cycle from enrolment through to employment. These surveys place more emphasis on criteria such as student experience, graduate outcomes and employer satisfaction than perceived reputation, research output and citation counts.

In the 2023 Employer Satisfaction Survey, graduates of the university had an overall employer satisfaction rate of 84.3%.

In the 2023 Graduate Outcomes Survey, graduates of the university had a full-time employment rate of 80.8% for undergraduates and 95.3% for postgraduates. The initial full-time salary was A$71,400 for undergraduates and A$94,500 for postgraduates.

In the 2023 Student Experience Survey, undergraduates at the university rated the quality of their entire educational experience at 76% meanwhile postgraduates rated their overall education experience at 75.9%.

== Student life ==
=== Student demographics ===
In 2017, 80% of undergraduate students study full-time and on campus, which is unique for a regional university, and 35% of students are international students.

== Notable people ==
=== Notable alumni ===
- Kate Allen, triathlete
- Martin Andanar, press secretary of the Philippines under Duterte administration
- Aunty Donna, absurdist sketch comedy troupe
- William Baragwanath, geologist
- Phillip Bellingham, Winter Olympian
- Steve Bracks, former Premier of Victoria
- Sandy Blythe, wheelchair basketball player
- Dr Cyril P. Callister, inventor of Vegemite
- Darren Cheeseman, politician
- C. J. Coventry, historian
- Peter Crisp, politician
- Jacqueline Dark, opera singer
- David Davies, artist
- Jack Gervasoni, Australian Rules footballer
- Keith Hamilton, former Minister for Agriculture and former Minister for Aboriginal Affairs
- Ben Hardman, politician
- Emma Kearney, AFLW player
- Will Longstaff, artist
- Brad McEwan, Ten Network sports reporter
- Kiran Mazumdar-Shaw, businesswoman and associate of Biocon
- Steve Moneghetti, Olympic marathon runner
- Richard W Richards, physicist and Antarctic explorer
- Henry Sutton, inventor
- Libby Tanner, actress
- Wes Walters, artist
- Marcus Wills, artist

== See also ==
- List of universities in Australia
