= The Georgia Gazette (1763) =

American newspaper

- Banner from November 1766
- Type: Weekly newspaper
- Founder: James Johnston
- Founded: April 7, 1763
- Ceased publication: November 25, 1802 (223 years ago)
- Headquarters: Broughton Street, Savannah, Province of Georgia
- Country: United States

The Georgia Gazette was the first publication in the Province of Georgia. Owned by Scottish immigrant James Johnston, it was printed in Savannah between 1763 and 1802.

Another so-named newspaper was printed between 1978 and 1985.

== See also ==
- List of newspapers in Georgia (U.S. state)
