= Post Office Gallery =

University art gallery in Ballarat, Australia

Coordinates: 37.5614°S 143.8582°E

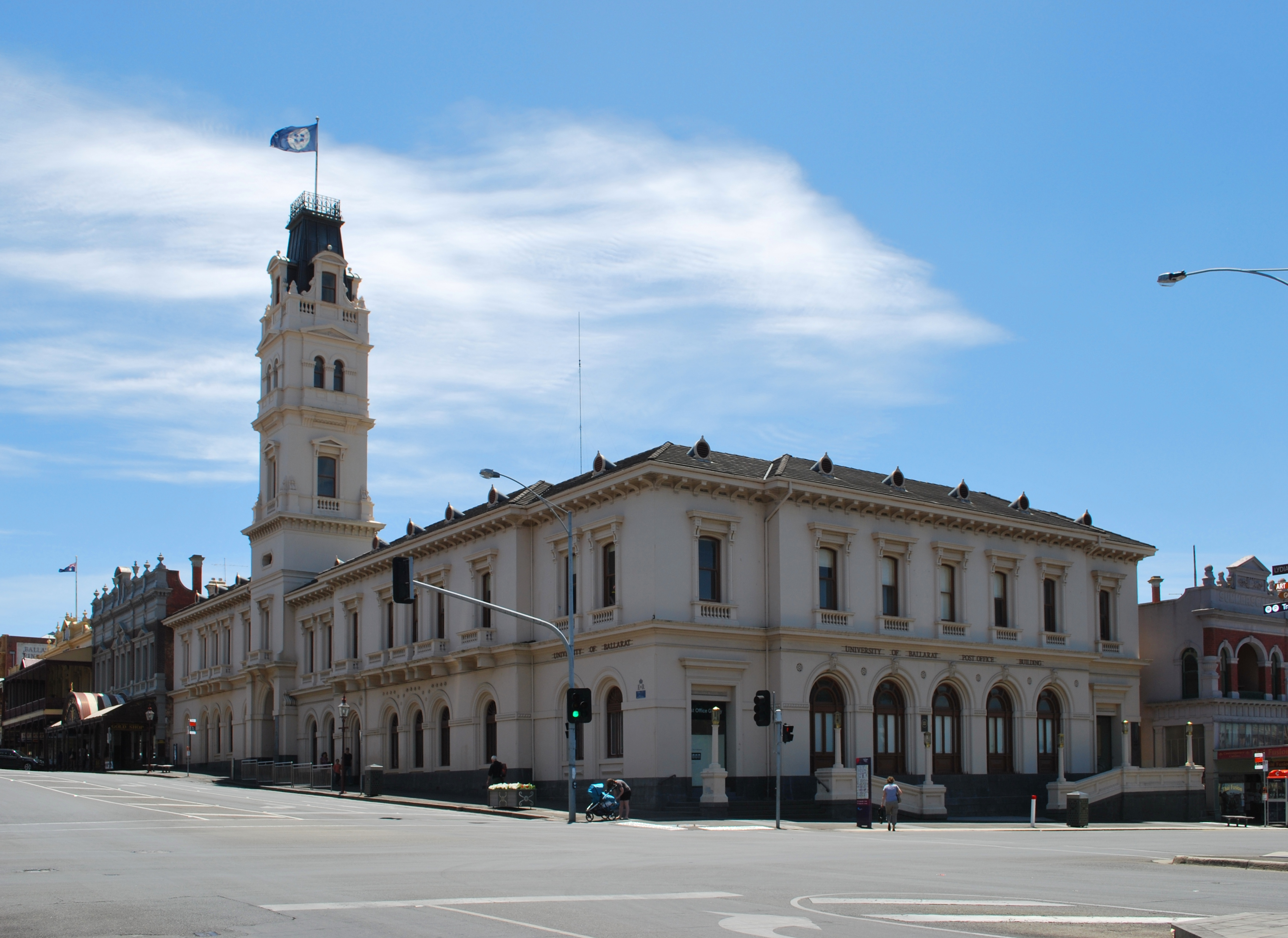
The former post office building

The Post Office Gallery is a university art gallery in Ballarat, Victoria, Australia.

The former Ballarat Post Office is located on the corner of Sturt and Lydiard Streets. Classified by Heritage Victoria Stage One was built in 1863 during William Wardell's tenure as inspector-general and chief architect of the Public Works Department. The Ballarat Post Office was the largest of its kind after the Melbourne General Post Office. It replaced earlier structures on the site.

In 2002 the Ballarat Post Office became part of the Federation University Australia (then University of Ballarat) Arts Academy, which includes the Post Office Gallery.
