= James Johnson (woodcarver) =

American woodcarver

- Born: Juneau, Alaska
- Style: Formline art, Northwest Coast art
- Website: jamesjohnsonnativeart.com

James Johnson is a Tlingit artist from Juneau, Alaska who primarily practices traditional formline and carving.

== Early life and background ==
Johnson was born into a family of Dakl’aweidi (Killerwhale Clan) of the Xutsnoowú Kwáan chiefs, notably Chief Gusht’eiheen (great-great-grandfather), Chief Jimmy Johnson (great-grandfather), and Chief Peter Johnson (grandfather). Johnson cites his ancestral history as having influenced his artistic career. His father, Franklin Johnson was the first to encourage him begin carving.

Johnson is also a lifelong snowboarder, having grown up snowboarding every week at Eaglecrest Ski Area.

== Career ==
Johnson describes himself as a self-taught artist. In 2012, Johnson's work Tlingit Hawkman was selected by Nathan Jackson to be featured in the Celebration Juried Art Show. In 2019, he was awarded First Place in Wood Sculpture at the SWAIA Santa Fe Indian Market. Johnson has since collaborated with brands such as Vans, Lib Technologies, and Google.

His work has also been featured at the Art Institute of Chicago, the Sioux Indian Museum, the Denver Museum of Nature and Science, and the Interior Museum.
