= James B. Johnson =

American novelist

- Born: 1944 (age 81–82)
- Occupation: Author

James B. Johnson (born 1944) is an American author of science fiction novels.

== Novels ==
- 1981 - Daystar and Shadow
- 1987 - Trekmaster (Published as "Treckmeister" in Germany.)
- 1988 - Mindhopper
- 1989 - Habu
- 1991 - A World Lost
- 2011 - Counterclockwise
