= Snowskates =

Snow sport equipment

Snowskates are a type of snow sport equipment intended to allow the user to emulate the actions of ice skating or inline skating on snow. They were first produced commercially in Germany in the 1930s.

Snowskates consist of a pair of flexible ski boots with integrated bases resembling sled runners that are approximately the same length as the boot itself, incorporating steel edges to grip the snow.

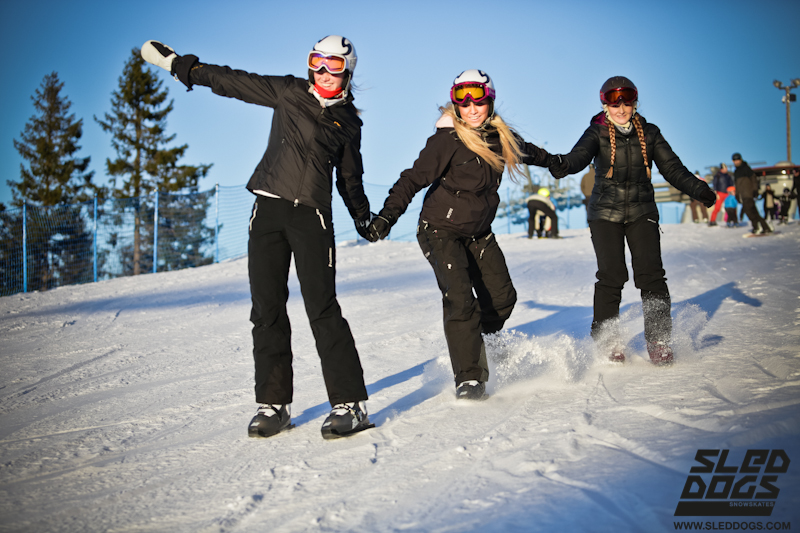
Sleddogs snowskates Oslo, Norway

The similar term snowskating may also apply to a skateboard for use on snow (which is a shortened term of "snowskateboarding").

== History ==
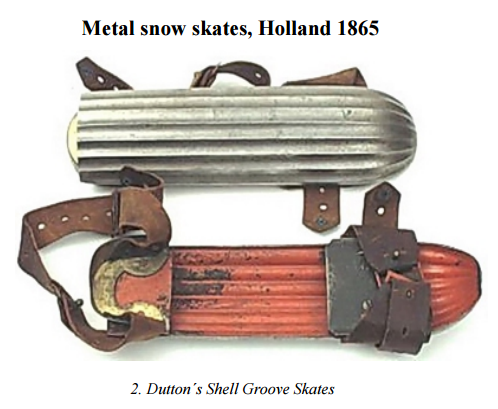
Metal snowskates from Holland, 1865

Snowskates were invented in The Netherlands, and originally consisted of a simple wood runner that was tied to the users boots around 1865.

The earliest versions came in many varieties and they were mostly custom-made as opposed to commercially produced. The more well-known, commercially produced models came from Germany in the 1950s. The modern version of snowskates was invented by Swiss inventor Hanes Jacob in the 1970s.
