= Jimmy Johnson (1940s shortstop) =

- Shortstop
- Batted: Unknown Threw: Unknown

Mexican League debut
- 1940, for the Alijadores de Tampico

Last Negro league baseball appearance
- 1943, for the Philadelphia Stars
- Stats at Baseball Reference

Teams
- Alijadores de Tampico (1940); Philadelphia Stars (1943)

James "Jeep" Johnson was an American baseball shortstop in the Mexican League and Negro leagues. He played with the Alijadores de Tampico in 1940 and the Philadelphia Stars in 1943.
