= James F. Johnson =

American blues/R&B/soul musician

James Franklin Johnson (February 23, 1926 – November 25, 2000), also known as James F. Johnson or Jimmy Johnson, was an American blues, rhythm and blues, and soul musician.

Johnson was born in Fordyce, Arkansas, the son of Golder Roland and Thomas Franklin Johnson.

He was a performer and a composer, associated with the Magnum Records label and Mercedes publisher. His eponymous recording studio was located in Watts, California. His groups included the Jimmy Johnson Combo and Jimmy Johnson and His Band. Johnson wrote the song "Don't Answer the Door", which was recorded by B.B. King, as well as "Every Day of Your Life", "Cold Cold Feeling", "Drowning on Dry Land" and "I Used To Be A Millionaire". (Note: His songs have sometimes been mistakenly attributed to his namesakes Jimmy Johnson and Jimmy Price Johnson.)

He died on November 25, 2000, in Los Angeles, California.
