= James Johnston (footballer, born 1866) =

Scottish footballer

Personal information
- Full name: James Johnston
- Date of birth: 16 September 1866
- Place of birth: Johnstone, Scotland
- Date of death: 10 February 1952 (aged 85)
- Place of death: Pawtucket, Rhode Island, United States
- Positions: Centre half; wing half

Senior career*
Years	Team	Apps	(Gls)
1883–1885	Johnstone		
1885–1891	Abercorn	13	(0)

International career
1888	Scotland	1	(0)
- * Club domestic league appearances and goals

James Johnston (Note: Spelled Johnstone in several sources, but research has shown official documents did not include an 'e'.) (16 September 1866 – 10 February 1952) was a Scottish footballer who played as a centre half and wing half.

== Career ==
Johnston played club football for Abercorn between 1885 and 1891. He made several representative appearances for Renfrewshire while with the Paisley club in that period, and also played for them in the inaugural season of the Scottish Football League in 1890–91 – they also reached the semi-finals of the Scottish Cup that year.

Johnston made one appearance for Scotland in 1888. He emigrated permanently to the United States around 1892 and played for local clubs there.
