= James Johnston (murderer) =

Australian convicted murderer

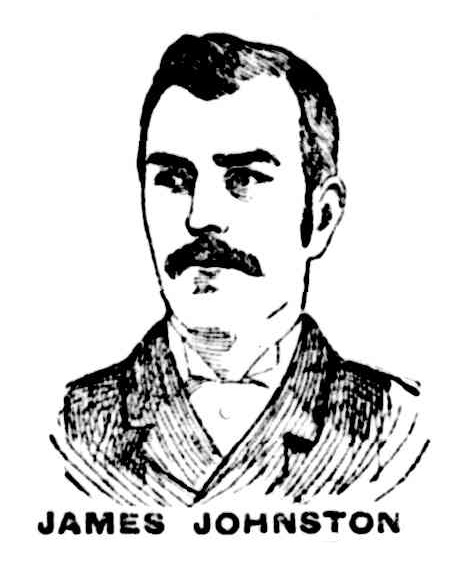
- James Johnston (courtroom illustration).
- Born: 1856; Mount Hollowback (near Ballarat), Victoria, Australia
- Died: 18 May 1891 (aged 35); Ballarat Gaol, Victoria, Australia
- Occupations: Stock and station agent
- Status: Executed by hanging
- Conviction: Murder
- Penalty: Death

James Johnston (1856 - 18 May 1891) was an Australian murderer who killed his wife and four young children in December 1890 at Ballarat in central Victoria.

James Johnston was stock and station agent who responded to a failing business and mounting debts by committing financial fraud. On the night of 8 December 1890, before his actions could be discovered, he killed his four young children in their beds, shot his wife in the head and attempted suicide by poisoning himself. Johnston was in a critical condition for about a month, before he began to recover. Even as he gained in strength he apparently suffered from paralysis of the legs and an inability to speak, punctuated by denials of reality and unbalanced ravings, which many saw as deliberate attempts to inculcate the idea that he was insane when he committed his crimes.

Johnston was convicted of his wife's murder in April 1891 and sentenced to death, with the jury rejecting the defence of insanity. In the hope of a reprieve of his scheduled execution his supporters made additional efforts to prove Johnston's insanity, but a government-appointed medical board concluded he was sane. Johnston was executed by hanging at Ballarat Gaol on 18 May 1891.

== Early life ==
James Johnston was born in 1856 at Mount Hollowback, Victoria, and his birth was registered at Ascot, Victoria. He was the eldest son of James Johnston and Margaret Brown (née Howden). His father had been an Assistant Gold Commissioner at Ballarat during the Eureka Rebellion, but by 1856 he owned land at Mount Hollowback near Ballarat.^{[A]}

Johnston (senior) had left the Government service "after acquiring a moderate competency by mining". However he eventually exhausted his funds, "and also through two or three very handsome remittances sent by wealthy friends" in the United Kingdom. He became "well-known as a racing and coursing judge".

For most of the period from about June 1858 until June 1869 Johnston (senior) worked as the poundkeeper at Pound Hill (also referred to as the "Ballaratshire pound") near Learmonth, north-west of Ballarat.

The Johnston family returned to Scotland for a short period in 1861.

== Business interests ==
By mid-1875 James Johnston (junior) was living at the gold mining settlement of Sandy Creek, near Pine Creek in the Northern Territory (north of Katherine). In July 1875 Johnston forwarded a "sample of washdirt" from the Sandy Creek Puddling Company as part of the collection of specimens intended for the Exhibitions of Philadelphia and Melbourne. In December 1875 Johnston's Sandy Creek Puddling Company sold its plant and equipment. By May 1876 Johnston was carrying on business as a storekeeper at Sandy Creek.

In about February 1878 Johnston opened a wholesale store at Shackle (Yam Creek), near Pine Creek. Johnston and Peter Alexander were in partnership in a store and licensed premises at Pine Creek. The partnership was dissolved in August 1878, with the business being carried on by Alexander.

In February 1881 Johnston, at "Port Darwin Camp", posted a notice asking debtors to pay their accounts by the end of March "as it is my intention to withdraw from storekeeping at the end of the wet season".

=== Marriage and business ===
In July 1881 'Donor's Hill' pastoral station in north-west Queensland was sold by Martin Hetzer to Messrs. Chirnside, Johnston, and Co., a partnership between James Johnston and Andrew Chirnside.^{[B]} By 1881 Johnston was residing at 'Donor's Hill', managing the station. 'Donor's Hill' station had frontages to the Flinders and Cloncurry rivers in the Gulf Country region, south of the southern extremity of the Gulf of Carpentaria in the Stokes region, about 80 miles (129 km) south of Normanton. In 1883 the property was running in excess of fifteen thousand sheep.

While Johnston was manager of 'Donor's Hill' station he suffered from an attack of "fever and ague", which was reputed to have "an after effect" whereby he "suffered from periodic headaches of a very violent nature". Johnston also "sustained a sunstroke while in Queensland". During his time in northern Queensland it was said that Johnston "sustained a serious fall from a horse, resulting in injuries to the spine".^{[C]}

James Johnston and Mary Gourlay ('Minnie') Harvey were married on 12 January 1882 at the house of the bride's parents at Buninyong, Victoria (a township near Ballarat).^{[D]}

In April 1882 Johnston was appointed as a magistrate in the Normanton jurisdiction. The couple's first two children were born at 'Donor's Hill' station in Queensland. The eldest child, Mary Gourlay (known as 'Queenie'), was born on 4 October 1882. Her younger sister, Constance Ruby (known as 'Ruby'), was born on 23 August 1883.

Johnston and his family returned to the Ballarat district, probably in late 1883, where "for about two years" Johnston was manager of 'Carranballac' station near Skipton, a pastoral estate owned at that stage by Robert Chirnside. Chirnside was three years older than Johnston and the two had known each other since their teenage years.

Johnston's father, James Johnston (senior), died on 22 January 1885 at his home in Buninyong, aged 59.

In December 1885 it was reported that James Johnston, a stock and station agent, held his first sale at the Corporation Saleyards in Ballarat. With good connections within the landholding class his business seemed to have good prospects for success. Johnston opened an account at the Ballarat branch of the City of Melbourne Bank in January 1886, however by the following April it was already in deficit by over four hundred pounds. In September 1886 Robert Chirnside gave Johnston a signed guarantee of £3,500, on the City of Melbourne Bank, in support of his business as a stock and station agent. The bank accepted the guarantee from Chirnside and credited Johnston's account with £2,500 in order to maintain its solvency.

James and Mary ('Minnie') Johnston had two more children, both born in Ballarat. James Gordon (known as 'Gordon') was born on 19 June 1887 at the family residence of 22 Pleasant Street. The youngest child of the family, Gladys Pearl (known as 'Pearl'), was born on 29 October 1888 at 21 Drummond Street in Ballarat.

Johnston's mother Margaret died on 15 July 1888 at Buninyong, Victoria, aged 57.

By the late 1880s Johnston's business was in serious trouble with mounting debts in a stagnating economy. Business matters "were not as brisk as they might have been, and financial affairs no doubt pressed themselves upon his attention with a persistency that business men do not relish". In September 1889 Robert Chirnside provided to Johnston a further signed guarantee of £1,500 on the City of Melbourne Bank. By July 1890 Johnston's account was overdrawn by £4,000 (in addition to the guarantee acceptance of £2,500).

By early December 1890 Johnston's financial situation had become a pressing matter to the manager of the Ballarat branch of the City of Melbourne Bank, Andrew Williamson. A cheque of Johnston's for £575, payable to Robert Chirnside, had been presented at the bank and dishonoured. Williamson told Johnston "he wanted the account reduced", and Johnston replied that Chirnside would be taking over his interest "in a Queensland property" and he was expecting a cheque from him of £5,000. Williamson visited Johnston at his home on the morning of 7 December 1890, where the stock and station agent was bedridden with a "bad headache". Johnston told the bank manager he would deliver Chirnside's cheque the next day. On Monday, 8 December, he handed Williamson a blank cheque signed "Robert Chirnside", with "Credit J. Johnston and Co. account only" written across it in Johnston's handwriting. Johnston instructed the bank manager to write out the amount as either £5,000 or "the full amount owing". As Johnston "was conducting his business in an unsatisfactory manner" Williamson decided to "call up the advance" and filled in the amount as £6,816 10s., payable on the Union Bank.

Johnston murdered his family during the night of the same day he had delivered the blank cheque to the bank. It was subsequently discovered that Chirnside had never promised to give Johnston a cheque for £5,000, nor had he signed the blank cheque.^{[E]}

== Murders and inquests ==
At about seven o'clock on the morning of Tuesday, 9 December 1890, Katie Hicks, a servant living in the Johnston household at 21 Drummond Street in Ballarat, rose from her bed in the same room where the four children slept. Not wishing to wake the children, she left the blinds down and went about her usual morning work routine. At about eight o'clock the household cook, Lily Dobson, entered the nursery bedroom to rouse the children, when it was discovered that each of the children were "cold and still in death". The next-door neighbour Rebecca Oldham, the wife of a school teacher, was then informed of the tragedy. Mrs. Oldham's daughter was sent to report the matter to the police and request the presence of doctors. The children's mother, Mary Johnston, was discovered in her bed, mortally wounded with a bullet embedded in her brain, apparently shot while she was lying asleep. The gun had been held very close to her ear, its discharge leaving gunpowder marks on her face. James Johnston was found in a spare room, in a semi-conscious state and convulsing after having apparently taken poison. He was taken to the hospital where a stomach pump was applied and emetics administered. A revolver was found in a drawer in the spare room, wrapped in red flannel. Katie Hicks later recalled being woken in the night by the sound of a gunshot. She did not hear anyone moving about the house after that, but she remained awake for the rest of the night.

The bodies of the two eldest girls were found lying in their double bed. Ruby (aged seven) was on her back next to the wall and eight year-old Mary ('Queenie') was lying with the right side of her face buried in the pillow ("as though some great weight had been put upon it"). The boy, Gordon (aged three), was lying on his back in an adjacent bed, with "frothy mucus exuding from his nostrils and mouth". The youngest child, Pearl (aged two), was found lying on her back in a cot, with a "soothing teat" in her mouth. An inquest into the deaths of the four Johnston children by the district coroner, J. C. Thomson, commenced on the following day, 10 December. In their evidence both doctors who had attended the scene, Drs. Hardy and Morrison, concluded that the children's deaths were caused by asphyxiation caused by suffocation. Later analysis of the stomach contents of several of the children by the government analytical chemist indicated that prussic acid poisoning may have been at least a significant factor in the deaths of the children.

Mary Johnston died from the bullet wound to her brain on the evening of Sunday, 14 December. James Johnston's condition was at that stage was considered "to be rapidly sinking" and he was not expected to live much longer. An inquest into Mrs. Johnston's death was commenced on 15 December. On Wednesday morning, 17 December, James Johnston's health rallied. He regained consciousness and "was able to converse a little with his relatives".

On 20 December 1890 Johnston was removed from the hospital to the Ballarat Gaol after the police consulted with the medical staff to ensure he was in a fit state to be transferred. After the consultation Detective Charles approached Johnston and said: "I've got a warrant here... for your arrest for the murder of your little girl". Johnston "appeared to be terribly agitated" and said to the detective, "Take me to them; take me home to them", to which Charles answered: "I can't, they are all dead". Johnston was then formally remanded until the inquest and conveyed by cab to the gaol, where he was placed in a bed in the hospital ward under the care of the prison medical officer, Dr. Jordan.

In early January 1891 it was reported that Johnston was "gradually losing weight and strength, and while he remains in his present state his chances of recovery are daily lessening". But mid-January Johnston's health had improved, with every chance he would "regain his bodily strength to a certain extent". By that stage he was apparently unable to speak, communicating by writing on a slate board, and on repeated occasions asked to see his wife and children. Johnston's case was called on several occasions at the City Police Court, but each time his medical attendant, Dr. Jordan, certified that he was unable to appear and he remained remanded in custody. After Johnston was once again remanded on 14 February 1891, certified as being unfit to appear, the bench of magistrates decided that a "second medical man should be called in to examine the accused". In late February it was reported that Johnston "continues to improve, and there appears to be every likelihood that before long he will be able to sit up". It was anticipated that he would be well enough to be present at the inquest to be held on 10 March. Johnston had "been informed of the fearful tragedy, and since then he appears to be very melancholy".

The inquests into the deaths of Mary Johnston and her four children was concluded on 11 March 1891 in the City Police Court at Ballarat, before the magistrate Mr. Haycroft (in the absence of the coroner). After the evidence had been given Haycroft instructed the jury to "discharge from their minds all evidence having reference to the death of the children", but instead to consider the manner in which Mrs. Johnston died and whether there was sufficient evidence against her husband to be charged with her murder. The jury, after a retirement of eight minutes, found that Mary Johnston had died from a bullet wound to her head inflicted by her husband on the night of 8 December 1890 (or early the following morning), from which the jury determined that James Johnston "was guilty of wilful murder". When asked if he had anything to say, Johnston wrote on a slate "Not guilty, leave all to Mr. Morrow" (his attorney, of the firm Cuthbert, Wynne, and Co.). The magistrate then formally committed Johnston to be tried on 10 April 1890 at the criminal sittings of the Supreme Court in Ballarat.

== Trial ==
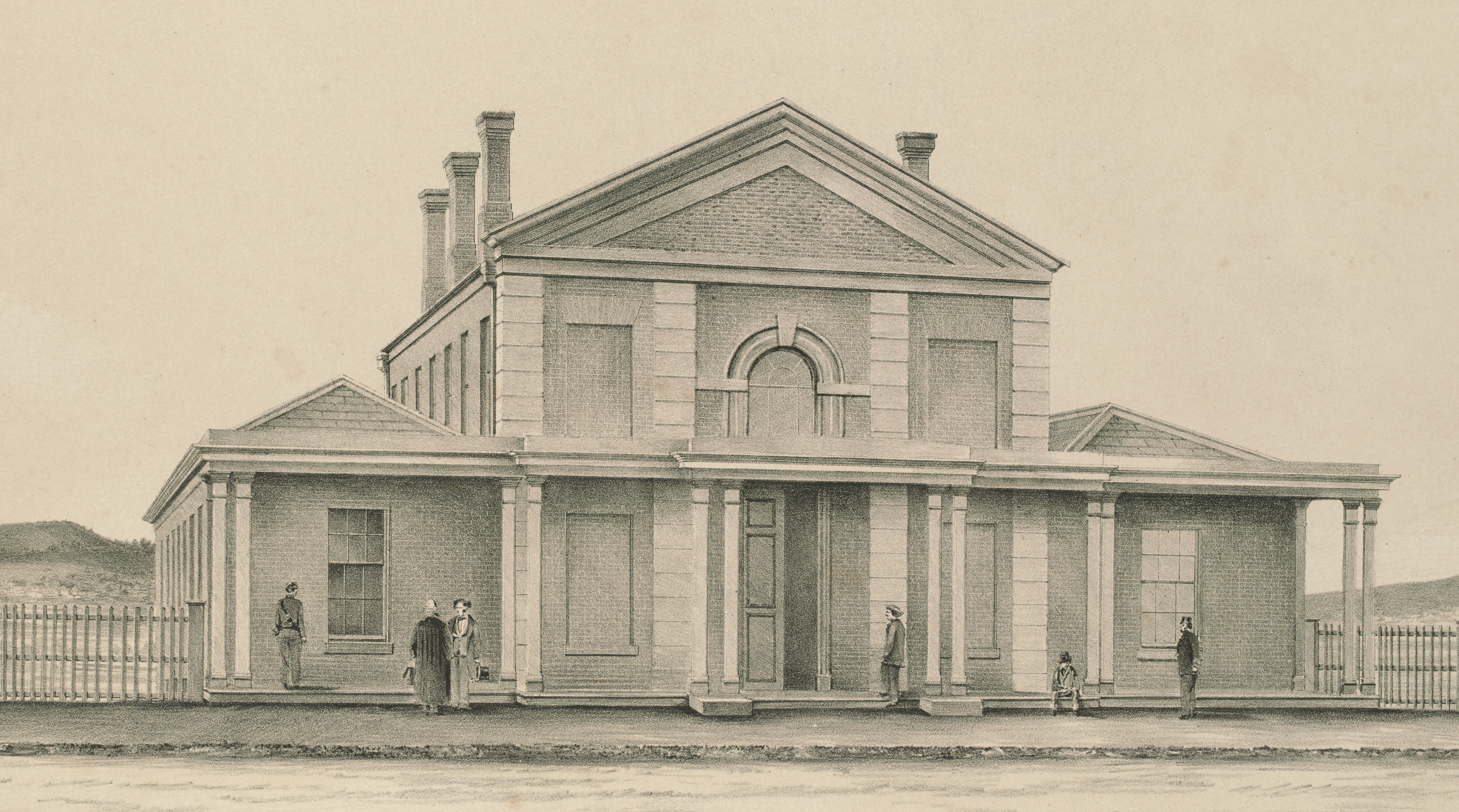
The Supreme Court at Ballarat (lithograph)

The Supreme Court trial of James Johnston, charged with the wilful murder of his wife Mary Gourlay Johnston, was held at Ballarat on 10 April 1891 before Justice George Webb. Johnston was carried into court and placed on an ambulance stretcher in the courtroom. When the charge was read out to Johnston he shook his head and, "still being speechless", wrote on a slate "Not guilty".

The case for the defence was conducted by the barristers Charles B. Finlayson and E. P. Wynne. Finlayson explained that "it was not intended to deny that the tragedy had been committed by Johnston", but maintained that the prisoner "was out of his mind, suffering from the effects of a previous accident" when he killed the members of his family. The barrister cited as evidence of Johnston's insanity the fact that he forged Chirnside's signature, claiming: "No man in his right senses would be such an idiot as to sign a cheque for such a large amount". Finlayson further claimed that the act of a man "getting up of a night and killing his family showed, without any further evidence, that he was insane". The prosecutor, J. T. T. Smith, in addressing the jury, said that in relation to his financial difficulties "Johnston preferred suicide to dishonour". He knew that when the crime of forging the cheque was discovered "he would be taken away from his wife and family", but rather than allow this to happen he decided to kill his whole family and then commit suicide.

In his summing up Justice Webb instructed the jury that "they would have to bring in a verdict of guilty of murder, or not guilty on the ground of insanity". The judge later elaborated that in his opinion "there were very slight grounds in support of the insanity plea". Justice Webb explained that he considered that Johnston's kindness and affection to his wife and children had been "the cause of the prisoner's action", adding: "Having determined to take his own life, he had apparently resolved to also take the lives of his wife and children, rather than let them live to suffer".

After nearly four hours of deliberation, the jury returned with a verdict of "guilty of wilful murder". Justice Webb said that he entirely concurred with the jury's verdict. He then addressed the prisoner, saying: "You could not stand the degradation in the eyes of your family, and in your affection for them you decided not to leave them in the cold mercies of the world", but instead chose "to send your wife and four unfortunate children to eternity quite unprepared and without a moment's notice". He then sentenced Johnston to death by hanging. As the prisoner was being carried in a stretcher from the courtroom, he "shuddered, and then placed his handkerchief across his face".

== Execution ==
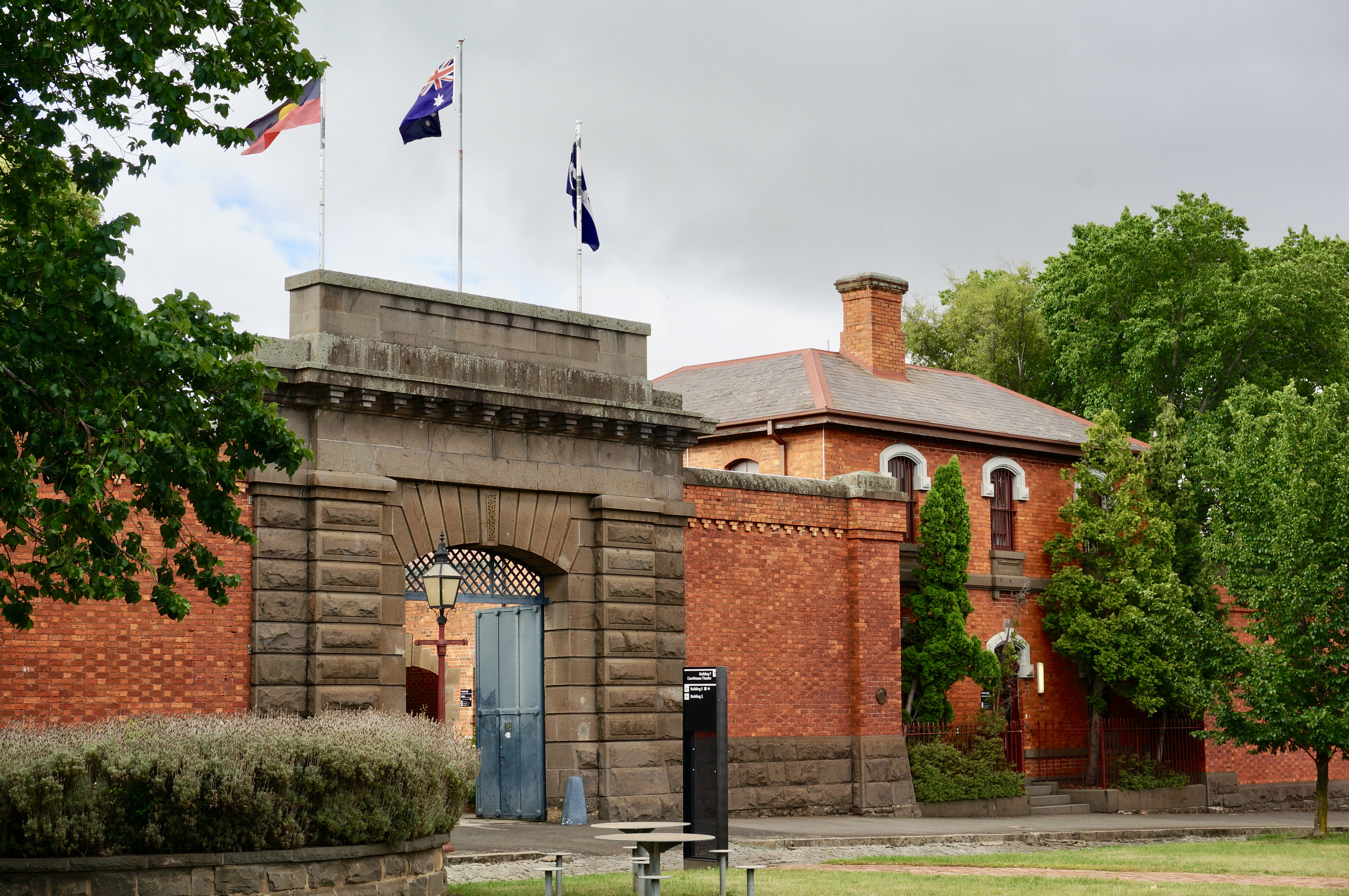
The entrance to Ballarat Gaol

With Johnston receiving a sentence of death, there were then three prisoners condemned to death occupying cells at Ballarat Gaol. The other two were John Wilson (alias Frank Spearin), sentenced for "criminal assault on a little girl", and Cornelius Bourke, convicted of the murder of a fellow prisoner named Stewart in Hamilton Gaol. It was reported that "Johnston does not appear to be much affected by the sentence passed upon him, and is apparently reconciled to his fate". On 28 April the Executive Council met to consider the cases of James Johnston and John Wilson in Ballarat Gaol under sentence of death. It was decided that both men should be executed on 11 May 1891, at the same time on one scaffold. A petition "numerously signed by doctors" had been lodged praying for Johnston's reprieve on the grounds that the details of the crime supported the theory that he was insane when he committed it. The reply by the Executive Council supported the decision of the jury and rejected the petition.

After the execution date had been decided a new theory was propounded, initiated by Dr. Rankin of Melbourne, an uncle of Mrs. Johnston, that "whatever Johnston's state of mind might have been when he committed the crime, he was clearly insane now". Dr. Rankin "communicated with several medical men in Ballarat" and after midnight on the night before the scheduled execution, doctors Scott, Whitcombe and Hardy, in company with the prison medical officer, Dr. Jordan, visited Johnston in his cell. Dr. Scott declined to certify to the prisoner's insanity, but Whitcombe and Hardy were of the opinion he was insane. The medical opinions were transmitted to Government House, and as the issue of Johnston's present insanity had not been previously raised, it was hastily decided to postpone the execution until a board of medical experts had the opportunity to examine the prisoner.

On 11 May at about ten minutes before ten o'clock, the hour appointed for the executions, "there was a stir in the street". The postmaster and the head of the Ballarat telegraph office "were seen driving in a cab towards the gaol at a furious rate". The postmaster was admitted to the gaol bearing telegrams addressed to Sheriff Anderson, one from the Governor of Victoria, Lord Hoptoun, and the other from the Attorney-General. A meeting between the postmaster, Sheriff Anderson and the governor of the gaol was held, after which the gaol governor proceeded to the cell where Johnston was confined and informed him that he had "been respited". The telegrams had instructed the sheriff to postpone Johnston's execution until the following Monday, 18 May. The execution of John Wilson was then carried out as planned.

The four doctors appointed to examine Johnston arrived at Ballarat on 13 May. They proceeded to the gaol where Johnston was subjected to "a most searching examination" for an hour and a half. It was determined by the board of medical experts, "by strategy and scientific examination", that the prisoner was sane. Dr. Youl, the chairman of the medical board, then telegraphed the Chief Secretary informing him that Johnston was considered to be "perfectly sane".

At Ballarat Gaol at a quarter past ten o'clock on 18 May 1891, after the sixteen spectators were in place (eight of whom were representatives of the press), Sheriff Anderson and Dr. Jordan ascended the staircase leading to the gallows where the formal process of demanding the body of James Johnston from the prison governor was carried out. When Johnston appeared he was being dragged onto the scaffold by the Victorian hangman, Thomas Jones, seated on an office chair to which wheels had been affixed. Jones, who was not wearing his customary false beard, wheeled the prisoner onto the drop beneath the rope "and occupied a minute or two in settling the chair". Jones slipped the noose onto Johnston's neck and the sheriff asked the condemned man if he had anything to say, to which he shook his head. The hangman then assisted the prisoner to rise and "he stood firmly on his legs without a tremor". Jones tightened the rope, pulled down the cap and walked to the lever. The signal was given, the bolt was drawn and "Johnston expiated his crimes by his death".

== Aftermath ==
After Johnston's body had hung for an hour, it was cut down and examined by Dr. Jordan. An inquest was then held, finding that "death was caused by dislocation of the neck by judicial hanging". No autopsy was allowed, by law and by the stated request of the condemned man, even though several doctors had expressed a wish to open the body "to ascertain whether there was any encysted tumor or lesion in connection with the brain that would in any way justify the supposition that Johnston might have been insane at the time he committed the murders". Johnston had requested that his body be handed over to his relatives, but this was not permitted by law. In the late afternoon his remains were interred in quicklime in a grave in the prison exercise yard beside those of Bourke and Wilson.

Throughout the recovery of Johnston's health until after his execution, the question of whether he was malingering was a topic of public debate and speculation. A discussion on this subject in The Ballarat Star concluded that he had been shamming, based on the opinions of "all who knew him most intimately". Johnston's apparent paralysis of his legs and inability to speak, his denial of the reality of his situation and unbalanced ravings, were the subjects of examination at various times by competent and astute doctors who pronounced him to be sane and regarded him as an accomplished malingerer whose object was to "give some color to the theory that he was insane when he committed the crime, for the sake of his relatives and his own reputation".

== Notes ==
A.James Johnston (senior) arrived at Melbourne from Scotland in 1852. In November 1853 he was appointed as an Assistant Gold Commissioner on the Victorian gold-fields. Soon afterwards Johnston sent for his fiancée Margaret Brown Howden to join him. She arrived on the vessel Hurricane and the couple were married a week later, at Geelong on 9 August 1854. By September the couple were living in the government compound of Camp Hill, on an escarpment overlooking the gold diggings and shanties at Ballarat. Johnston was one of the three government officials presiding over a judicial enquiry in October 1854 into the death of James Scobie, a prelude to the armed rebellion by disgruntled miners. After the events of the Eureka Stockade and the treason trials of February 1855, Johnston worked as a poundkeeper. The couple had fifteen children born from 1855 to 1875, about ten of whom survived to adulthood.

B.The ownership of 'Donor's Hill' was transferred from Martin Hetzer to Cyrus Mason "at a satisfactory price" in July 1881. In 1882 the owners of 'Donor's Hill' was described as either "Chirnside and Mason" or "Messrs. Chirnside, Johnston, and Co.". One 1883 reference records Messrs. Chirnside, Johnston, and Co. as the owners of 'Donor's Hill'.

C.Incidents such as these were recounted in newspaper reports and evidence at inquests and Johnston's trial as possible causes of Johnston's insanity, to support the proposition that his crimes were committed when he was suffering from a mental disorder and therefore not responsible for his actions.

D.Margaret Gourlay Harvey was born on 2 August 1858 at Buninyong, the eldest daughter of Robert M. Harvey (surveyor) and Jane (née Rankin).

E.After Robert Chirnside was informed by the manager of the Union Bank on 9 December that Johnston had presented a forged cheque in his name, Chirnside "wrote out a good cheque and redeemed the forged one".
