= James Johnston (publisher) =

Scottish newspaper publisher and printer (1738–1808)

- Born: 13 August 1738; Edinburgh, Scotland
- Died: 4 October 1808 (aged 70); Savannah, Georgia, U.S.
- Resting place: Colonial Park Cemetery, Savannah, Georgia, U.S.
- Occupation: Businessman

James Johnston (13 August 1738 – 4 October 1808) was a Scottish newspaper publisher and printer who became the first printer in colonial Georgia.

== Early life ==
Johnston was born in Edinburgh, Scotland, in 1738, the fourth child of Dr James Johnston and Jean Nisbet. In 1761, aged 23, he emigrated to Savannah, Province of Georgia, with his parents and eight siblings. Some of his siblings died in infacy; those who survived were: Lewis, Andrew, Marion, John, Rachael and Elizabeth. Lewis (a surgeon in the Royal Navy who arrived in Savannah earlier via Saint Kitts) and Andrew became physicians.

== Career ==
He became the province's public printer by legislative Act in 1762. The first issue of Georgia's first newspaper, The Georgia Gazette, was printed on 7 April 1763 at Johnston's printing office on Broughton Street in Savannah. It remained in business until 1802, although it did suspend publication during the American Revolution between 1776 and 1779, when he took over The Royal Georgia Gazette from loyalist John Daniel Hammerer. (Another Georgia Gazette was published between 1978 and 1985.)

In 1782, Johnston was banished from Georgia, under the second Act of Attainder, passed by the Revolutionary Government, but it is not known whether he left the state. Indeed, he renamed his newspaper again, in 1783, to the Gazette of the State of Georgia. He returned the newspaper to its original name in 1788. Two years later, he went into partnership with his 21-year-old son, as James and Nicholas Johnston. After Savannah's great fire of 1796, the name of the publishers became N. Johnston & Co. Nicholas died on 20 October 1792, and the following day's edition of the newspaper did not include a printer's name. The following week, it was listed as James Johnston once more. The final edition of the newspaper was published on 25 November 1802, at which point Johnston announced that the N. Johnston & Co. partnership had been dissolved. Johnston retired, aged 64.

== Personal life ==
Johnston married Sarah, a native of Saint Kitts and Nevis. He supported the Crown during the American Revolution but, according to the Georgia Historical Society, "did not lose the respect of the Patriots."

== Death ==
Johnston died in 1808, aged 70, leaving a widow and six children. He was interred in Savannah's Colonial Park Cemetery, where his parents were buried. His widow survived him by seven years and was interred beside him upon her death, aged 70.

== Legacy ==
In 1931, the Georgia Society of the Colonial Dames of America added a plaque on the left of the main entrance to The Marshall House in Savannah, which stands on the former site of Johnston's Broughton Street printing office. In 1955, the Georgia Historical Society erected a marker to Johnston in Colonial Park Cemetery.
