= Lib Technologies =

American snowboard manufacturer

Lib Technologies is an American snowboard manufacturer known for innovative snowboard designs and construction. Often referred to as Lib Tech, the company falls under the umbrella of parent company Mervin Manufacturing. Surf company Quiksilver bought Mervin in 1997. In 2013, Mervin was purchased by Altamont Capital Partners.

Lib Tech produces snowboards, surfboards, snow skates and wake surf boards from their manufacturing base in Sequim, Washington in the Pacific Northwest region of the United States.

== History ==
Mike Olson built his first snowboard in 1977, and by 1984 had dropped out of Pacific Lutheran University, to begin making snowboards full-time. Mervin Manufacturing's headquarters were set up in an "old racehorse barn," where Olson worked for two years, paying rent by mowing the lawn and cleaning the gutters for the barn's owner. Olson was quickly joined in his efforts by Pete Saari, and the two began producing small orders for members of the nascent snowboard community. Mike Olson’s first snowboards were called Slope Tools. In the early 80’s the GNU snowboard brand was started and was forced out of business by a controversial distribution deal with Wind line out of Seattle. Mike Olson and Pete Saari owned the factory and decided to start the Lib Technologies snowboard brand. Gnu snowboards was then reacquired from the bank a couple years later.

== Technology ==
=== Magne-Traction ===
Gravitating away from the long, smoothly curving sidewall and edge of a traditional snowboard, Lib Tech's Magne-Traction technology employs a "serrated" edge consisting of seven bumps in the side wall. According to Lib Tech's co-founder and VP of Marketing, Pete Saari:

"Magne-traction is 7 bumps or teeth along the length of your sidecut and edge each specifically sized and located to improve edge hold and focus control and power where you need it. The 3 largest most aggressive teeth are located between your feet adding control to the un-pressurable "dead zone" at and between your feet where your balance is centered. Smaller less aggressive teeth are located between your front foot and the contact area adding edge hold for turn initiation and control but keeping the tips and tails loose for catch-free freestyle."

Since its debut, Magne-Traction has been generally well received by both reviewers and the general snowboard community, winning more than 15 Transworld Good Wood Awards and over 20 Future magazine awards.

=== Banana Technology ===
The introduction of Lib Tech's Banana Technology marked yet another departure from orthodox snowboard design. Traditionally, snowboards are built with camber—the gentle arch formed in between the board's contact points when placed on a flat surface. Camber geometry was first introduced for skis, which each have only one central area of pressure input (i.e., under the skier's boot). Snowboards, however, have two areas of pressure input (i.e., one under the front boot, and one under the back boot), leaving the rider unable to efficiently depress the center of the snowboard, an effect which Lib Tech's Pete Saari calls the "dead zone."

Banana Technology does away with this "dead zone" by reversing the snowboard's camber between the rider's feet; rather than arcing upward, like traditionally cambered boards, those with Banana Technology arc downwards, allowing the board to rest on its center when placed on a flat surface. As Saari put it, "Banana Technology focuses edge pressure between your feet, bringing the dead zone to life. It adds catch free tips and tails for jibs, rails, and forgiving landings. It adds pre-bent rocker between your feet for edge hold and carving, and it adds tip and tail float in powder."

Banana Technology has been well received by the snowboard community; in 2008, Banana Technology's inaugural year, Lib Tech experienced an 81% spike in sales. Boards equipped with Banana Technology have garnered Lib Tech a slew of awards:

- Winner, 2009 Best of Test, Snowboarder Magazine (Skate Banana)
- Winner, 2009 Good Wood Test, Transworld Snowboarding (Skate Banana)
- Winner, 2009 Good Wood Test, Transworld Snowboarding (TRS BTX)
- Winner, 2009 Women's Good Wood Test, Transworld Snowboarding (TRS BTX)
- Tested Best, Men's Over $600, Future Snowboard Magazine (Cygnus X1 BTX)
- Tested Best, Men's $400–599, Future Snowboard Magazine (TRS BTX)
- Tested Best, Women's Over $400, Future Snowboard Magazine (TRS BTX)
- 2007 Innovation of the Year, SIA Snow press Innovation Awards (Skate Banana)

Banana Technology (BTX), like Magne-Traction before it, begins with the premise that a snowboard is not a ski. Banana Technology replaces camber with rocker "Banana" between your feet.

== Environmental sustainability ==
Lib Tech has had a historical commitment environmental sustainability. Mike Olson took the first steps towards sustainability early in the history of Lib Technologies; he replaced toxic ABS plastic with recyclable polyethylene in 1986, and introduced sustainable polymer top sheets and bamboo cores in 1995.

Currently, Lib Tech even has its own environmental task force, dubbed the "environMENTAL division," which oversees the company's sustainability measures. Not only does Lib Tech incorporate environmentally friendly materials into their snowboards (such as water-based graphics, non-petroleum-based bio-plastic top sheets, Volatile organic compound resin, renewable wood cores, and basalt fiber rather than fiberglass), but the company has also designed their factory with the environment (and the health of their employees) in mind. The factory's heating system runs on canola-based bio-diesel, which Lib-Tech makes available to employees and local farmers through a bio-diesel co-op program. Wood sawdust is recycled as a soil additive, scrap wood is repackaged as kindling, and scrap plastics are reground and reused. Water-cleansed grinding systems reduce airborne particulate levels, and the factory's air supply is constantly fresh due to a 2700% air-replacement ventilation system.

== Riders ==
The following snowboarders have been sponsored by Lib Tech:

- Jamie Lynn
- Travis Rice
- Austen Sweetin
- Eric Jackson
- Mark Landvik
- Chris Rasman
- Katie Kennedy
- Matt Cummins
- Ted Borland
- Phil Hansen
- Jesse Burtner
- Mans Hedberg

== See also ==
- 'Monoboard' section of Monoskiing
- Snowboarding
