= Thomas Ulick Burke =

Australian banker

Thomas Ulick Burke (1826–1867) was a well-known figure in gold-rush Victoria, Australia, famous as the victim of the "Break O' Day" aka "Scarsdale" aka "Piggoreet" murder.

== Life ==
Visitor information at Burke's grave at Smythesdale cemetery

Thomas Burke was born in 1826 in Normandy to a military family based in County Galway, Ireland. His parents were Captain John Burke of Her Majesty's 16th Lancers, Tiaquin, County Galway, and Jane Lowe.

Burke emigrated to Australia in 1858 from Ireland, where he had been working for the Provincial Bank of Ireland at Limerick. He arrived during the Victorian gold rush, moving first to Melbourne where he worked for the Bank of Australasia, before becoming manager of the Smythesdale branch of the bank around 1860. Smythesdale in the 1860s was a prosperous gold-mining town on the Woady Yaloak River in an area which supported a large though itinerant population of miners and other workers.

Burke married Louisa Blake, the daughter of Sir Thomas Edward Blake of Menlough Castle, Galway, at St John’s Church in Melbourne in 1862. The couple had two young children at the time of Burke's death in 1867. Burke was according to accounts of the day a popular and respected member of the community. He was a Justice of the Peace and in 1861 was elected president of the Smythesdale Mechanics' Institute and also elected to Smythesdale Council.

A contemporary newspaper account stated that Burke was a cousin of explorer Robert O'Hara Burke.

== Murder ==
One of Burke's tasks as bank manager was to travel throughout the Woady Yaloak diggings buying gold from miners. By this stage gold transports were no longer accompanied by armed escorts. Early on 10 May 1867, Burke collected a horse and buggy from the Smythesdale coach-builder and traveled to the Break O’ Day area (now Corindhap, Victoria), arriving at the nearby town of Rokewood at 1130 am. He bought gold at Rokewood and Break O’ Day, then left to make the return journey to Smythesdale, stopping at hotels along the way to buy more gold.

George Searle, a publican at Break O’ Day, and Joseph Ballan, his employee, left on horseback shortly afterward with the intention of robbing Burke. They travelled cross-country and intercepted Burke at what is now the intersection of the Pitfield-Scarsdale Road and the Old Pitfield Road. While Searle distracted Burke with conversation, Ballan walked behind him and shot him in the back of the head. Burke died instantly. Searle and Ballan secured the gold and cash that Burke was carrying, moved the buggy containing Burke's body into scrub beside the road, and released his horse. Louisa Burke raised the alarm when her husband failed to arrive home. Burke's body was discovered the next day.

== Investigation and trial ==
The Woady-Yaloak area was relatively densely populated in 1867, and several witnesses saw Searle and Ballan moving cross-country around the time of Burke's murder. The murder weapon and stolen gold were soon discovered stashed near Searle's hotel at Break O' Day. The pair were arrested and charged with murder.

During their trial, Searle admitted to the robbery but sought to have his charge of murder reduced because it was Ballan who had shot Burke. Searle and Ballan were tried at Ballarat by Judge Redmond Barry, who convicted them both of murder and sentenced them to death. Searle and Ballan were hanged at the Ballarat Gaol on 7 August 1867 and buried in the grounds. They were two of thirteen men executed at this prison before the abolition of capital punishment in Australia.

The murder achieved notoriety and the trial and execution were widely reported in newspapers around Australia. The courthouse was crowded during the trial and demand to attend the hanging was high.

== Aftermath of Burke's murder ==
Memorial to Thomas Ulick Burke near Smythesdale

Burke was buried in the Scarsdale General Cemetery. The plot is easily accessible today and is accompanied by a tourist information sign (see photo at top of page).

The murder caused distress among local business people, some of whom who felt it was no longer safe to travel unescorted. An employee of the Union Bank in Smythesdale asked the Police Superintendent at Ballarat for a police escort to be provided when he was carrying money, but the request was refused due to lack of resources.

Burke's existing children, Elly Elizabeth and John Lambert, survived to adulthood. Louisa was pregnant at the time of Burke's murder and a third child was born and named Ulick Thomas in December 1867. Louisa remarried in 1872, to John King, with whom she had more children. Elly married William Saunders in Fitzroy, Melbourne in June 1889. John married Minnie Aikenhead at West Devonport, Tasmania, in February 1891. Ulick moved to Tasmania and then to Queensland, where he ran a dairy farm and served in the Australian infantry in World War I.

In 1972 a monument was erected near the site of Burke’s murder by Smythesdale residents (see photo above). In 2001 an alternative monument was erected beside it by a descendant who disagreed with the description of the murderers as "bushrangers". Both monuments are accessible beside the Pitfield-Scarsdale Road between Scarsdale and Rokewood, about 100 meters south of Old Pitfield Road intersection, at 37.7338°S 143.6440°E .

In 2002 geologist and historian Laurie Moore published a book on the Burke murder. "Shot for Gold: The murder of Thomas Ulick Burke at the Woady Yaloak goldfield" is available from the Woady Yaloak Historical Society which is headquartered in Smythesdale.
