= James Johnstone (antiquary) =

Scandinavian antiquarian

- Died: 1798
- Occupation: Antiquarian

James Johnstone (died 1798) was a Scandinavian antiquarian.

== Biography ==
Johnstone was a Master of Arts, though of what university is not stated, and a clergyman of the established church. For several years, he was chaplain to the English envoy extraordinary in Denmark. Afterwards he became rector of Magheracross, cos. Tyrone and Fermanagh, Ireland, and seems to have been appointed prebendary of Clogher in 1794 (Cotton, Fasti Eccl. Hib. iii. 101). He died in 1798, and his library was sold by auction in 1810.

His works are: 1. ‘Anecdotes of Olave the Black, King of Man, and the Hebridian Princes of the Somerled Family. To which are added Eighteen Eulogies on Haco, King of Norway; by Snorro Sturlson, poet to that Monarch: now first published in the original Islandic, from the Flateyan and other Manuscripts; with a literal Version and Notes,’ [Copenhagen], 1780, 8vo. 2. ‘Lodbrokar-Quida; or, the Death-Song of Lodbrok: now first correctly printed from various Manuscripts, with a free English Translation: to which are added the various Readings, a literal Latin Version, an Islando-Latino Glossary, and Explanatory Notes,’ London, 1782, 16mo; Copenhagen, 1813, 16mo. 3. ‘The Norwegian Account of Haco's Expedition against Scotland in 1263. In the original Islandic, from the Flateyan and Frisian MS.; with a literal English Version and Notes,’ Copenhagen, 1782, 4to; reprinted, Edinburgh, 1882, 8vo. 4. ‘Antiquitates Celto-Scandicæ, sive Series Rerum Gestarum inter Nationes Britannicarum Insularum et Gentes Septentrionales,’ 1784, 4to. 5. ‘The Robbing of the Nunnery, or the Abbess outwitted. A Danish Ballad, translated into English in the style of the Sixteenth Century,’ Copenhagen, 1786, 24mo: printed as a compliment to Louisa Augusta, daughter of Frederick VI of Denmark, on her marriage with the Duke of Holstein-Augustenberg. 6. ‘Antiquitates Celto-Normannicæ; containing the Chronicle of Man and the Isles, abridged by Camden, and now first published complete from the original MS. in the British Museum; with an English Translation and Notes,’ Copenhagen, 1786, 4to. This work was attacked by Richard Gough in the ‘Gentleman's Magazine’ for December 1786, p. 1061, and defended in the same periodical for July 1787, p. 565.
