= Jim Johnson (footballer) =

English footballer

Personal information
- Full name: James Johnson
- Date of birth: 26 March 1923
- Place of birth: Stockton-on-Tees, England
- Date of death: May 1987 (aged 64)
- Place of death: Stockton-on-Tees, England
- Position: Forward

Senior career*
Years	Team	Apps	(Gls)
1943–1945	York City	0	(0)
1945–1951	Grimsby Town	6	(1)
1951	Carlisle United	8	(0)
- * Club domestic league appearances and goals

James Johnson (26 March 1923 – May 1987) was an English professional footballer who played as a forward.
