= James Allen Johnson =

United States Army general

James A. Johnson
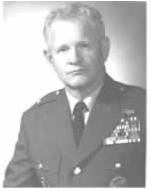
- Born: June 2, 1924; Stoughton, Wisconsin, U.S.
- Died: July 20, 2016 (aged 92) Fairfax County, Virginia, U.S.
- Buried: West Point Cemetery
- Allegiance: United States
- Branch: United States Army
- Service years: 1943–1944, 1947–1980
- Rank: Major General
- Commands: U.S. Army Engineer School; U.S. Army Engineer Command, Vietnam
- Conflicts: World War II; Korean War; Vietnam War

James Allen Johnson (June 2, 1924 – July 20, 2016) was a major general in the United States Army who served as Commandant of the U.S. Army Engineer School at Fort Belvoir, and as Deputy Chief of Engineers. He was awarded two Distinguished Service Medals, the Silver Star, two Legion of Merit decorations, two Bronze Star Medals, two Purple Hearts, the Air Medal, the Combat Infantryman's Badge, and the Parachute Badge.

Born in Stoughton, Wisconsin to Norwegian immigrant parents, Johnson graduated from Stoughton High School in 1942. After studying at the University of Wisconsin for one semester, he was drafted into the Army on March 12, 1943, during World War II. Johnson was appointed to the United States Military Academy and graduated with a B.S. degree after three years of study on June 3, 1947. After serving as a combat engineer in Korea, he earned an M.S. degree in industrial engineering from Stanford University in 1957. Johnson later graduated from the Army Command and General Staff College in 1961 and, after a tour of duty in Vietnam, the Industrial College of the Armed Forces in 1966. His second tour of duty in Vietnam was as commanding general of the U.S. Army Engineer Command and Director of Construction for the Military Assistance Command.

Johnson retired from active duty in August 1980 and settled in Fairfax Station, Virginia. He died at Fort Belvoir and was buried in the West Point Cemetery on September 26, 2016.

== Sources ==
- "First Lieutenant James A. Johnson" 5th Regimental Combat Team, Remembering the "Forgotten War": U.S. Army Engineer Officers in Korea, pp. 146–57. Office of History, U.S. Army Corps of Engineers. (Alexandria, VA: July 2004).
- "Major General James A. Johnson", Engineer Profiles. Charles Hendricks, interviewer. Office of History, U.S. Army Corps of Engineers. (Washington, DC: 1993).
- "Where are they now? A look at former commanders of the Philadelphia District", 1968-1971: Col. James A. Johnson. U.S. Army Corps of Engineers, Philadelphia District.
