= James A. C. Johnson =

American politician

James A. C. Johnson (1867 – December 17, 1937) was a Democratic Party politician who served as the Mayor of Englewood, New Jersey and in the New Jersey Senate.

He was born in Jamaica and graduated from Columbia Law School. He served as the Mayor of Englewood, New Jersey from 1910 to January 1911 when he resigned to take as seat in the New Jersey Senate, serving there from 1911 to 1913. He died at Montigo Bay Hospital in Jamaica.
