= Jim Johnson (baseball, born 1945) =

American baseball player

- Pitcher
- Born: November 3, 1945; Muskegon, Michigan, U.S.
- Died: December 6, 1987 (aged 42); North Muskegon, Michigan, U.S.
- Batted: Left Threw: Left

MLB debut
- April 13, 1970, for the San Francisco Giants

Last MLB appearance
- April 18, 1970, for the San Francisco Giants

MLB statistics
- Win–loss record: 1–0
- Earned run average: 8.10
- Innings pitched: 6 2/3
- Stats at Baseball Reference

Teams
- San Francisco Giants (1970)

James Brian Johnson (November 3, 1945 – December 6, 1987) was an American professional baseball player. A left-handed pitcher, he appeared in three Major League games during the early days of the 1970 season as a member of the San Francisco Giants. Born in Muskegon, Michigan, he stood 5 feet 11 inches (1.80 m) tall and weighed 195 pounds (88 kg).

An alumnus of Western Michigan University, he entered professional baseball after being selected by the Giants in the third round of the secondary phase of the June 1967 Major League Baseball draft. After three years of seasoning in the Giants' farm system, he made the early-season roster of the 1970 Giants.

His three MLB appearances all came in relief. In his debut, April 13 at Atlanta–Fulton County Stadium, he took over from Giants' starting pitcher Frank Reberger in the first inning with the Giants trailing 4–0. He pitched creditably and held the Giants close until the fourth inning, when Atlanta reached him for five hits and five earned runs en route to a 9–3 Braves' triumph. In his second appearance, three days later against the Houston Astros, Johnson worked two hitless innings but his three bases on balls resulted in another earned run charged against his record; however, the Giants won that contest 11–9.

Finally, on April 18, 1970, Johnson again relieved Reberger after the starter experienced a tough outing. Entering the game against the Cincinnati Reds at Crosley Field in the fourth inning, Johnson allowed three inherited runners to score, but eventually stopped a Cincinnati rally with the Reds' leading 8–3. Johnson then pitched a scoreless fifth inning and exited for a pinch hitter in the top of the sixth; but in that inning, San Francisco rallied for seven runs and eventually won 16–9, earning Johnson the victory.

He then was returned the Giants' minor league system and he retired after the 1970 season. In the Majors, he allowed eight hits, six earned runs, and five bases on balls, while recording two strikeouts.

Johnson became an educator after leaving baseball, and in 1983 he was named superintendent of schools in North Muskegon, Michigan. Four years later, he died from cancer at the age of 42.
