= List of heritage sites in Brunswick =

This is a list of heritage-listed sites in Brunswick, an inner-city suburb of Melbourne, Victoria, Australia. Brunswick has a large number of places of heritage significance, in the form of individual buildings as well as urban conservation precincts covering entire streets or substantial parts of them.

== Victorian Heritage Register listings ==
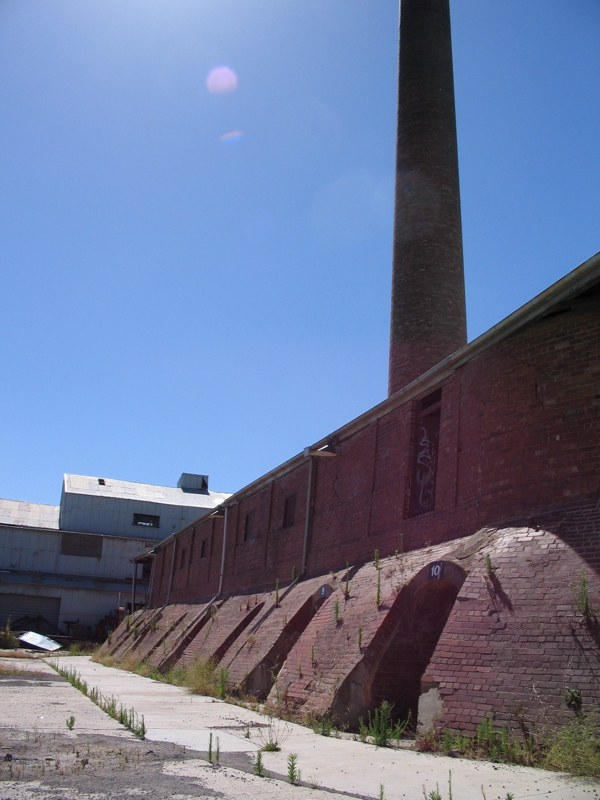
A kiln exterior and chimney at the former Brunswick brickworks No. 2

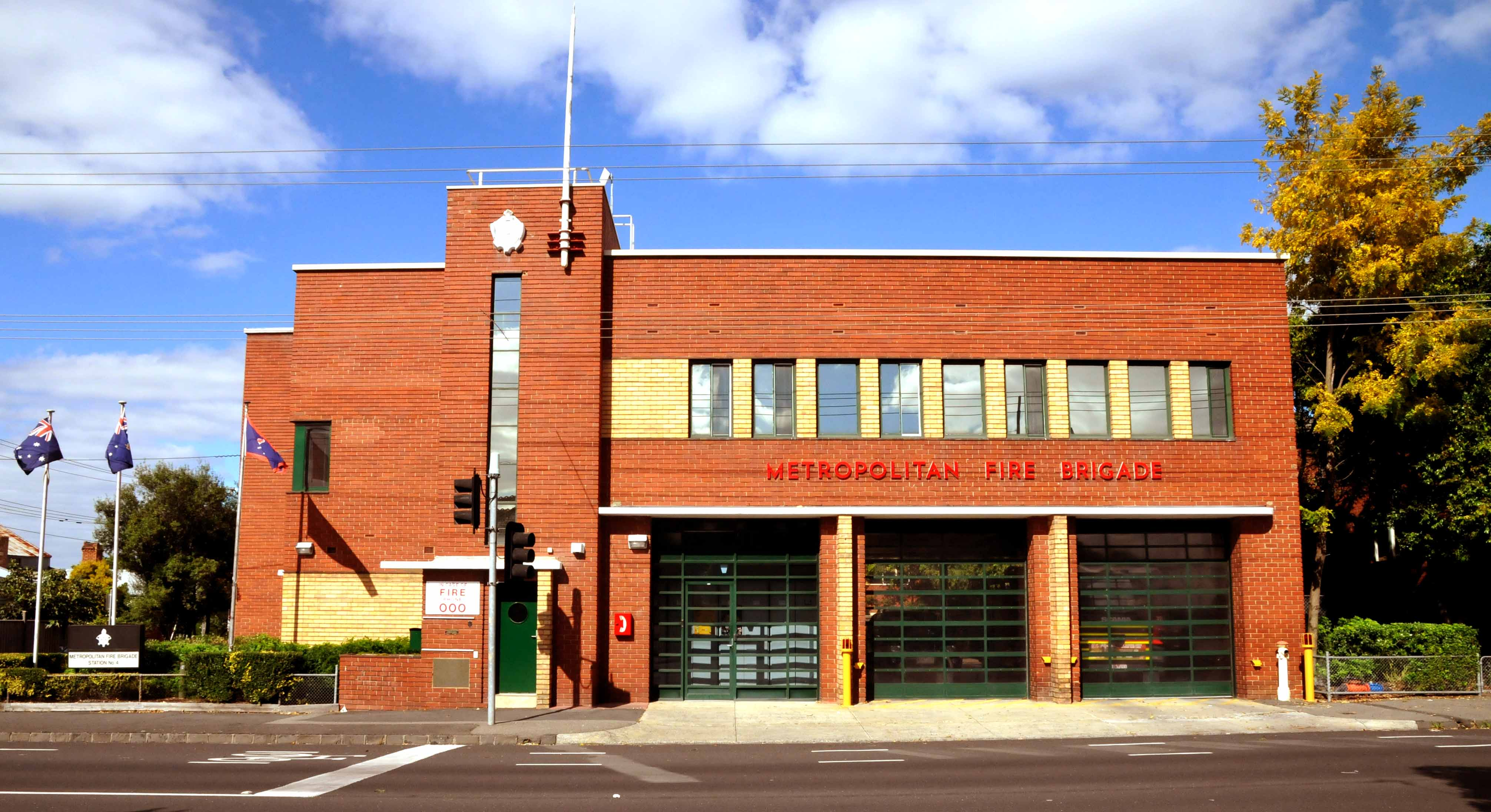
The fire station in 2012

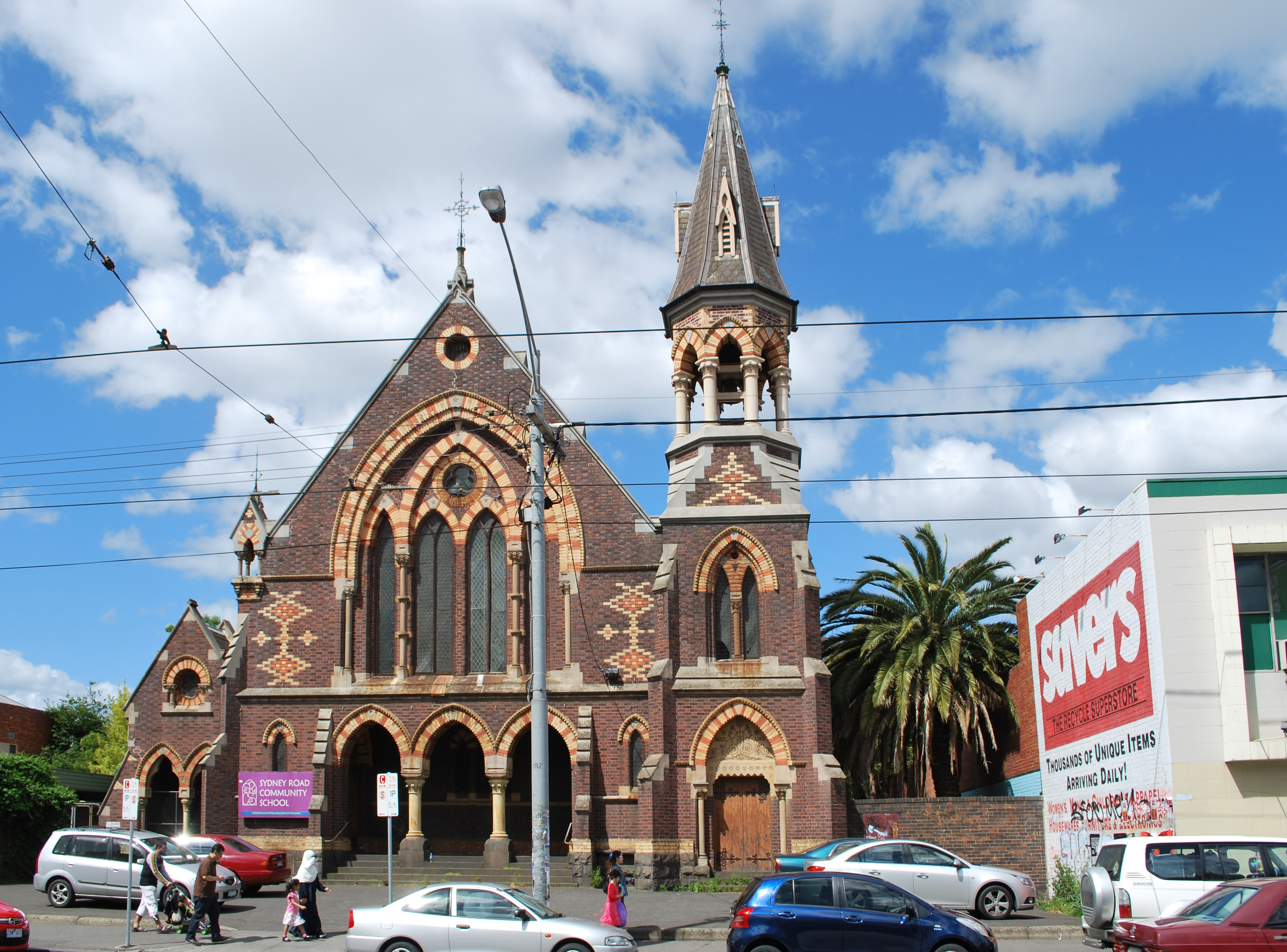
Wesleyan Church and Sunday School (former)

The Victorian Heritage Register has listings for the following places in Brunswick:

- Australian Licorice Company (former) factory chimney and fire tunnel remains, 342–348 Victoria Street
- Bluestone Cottage, 130 Barkly Street
- Brunswick brickworks (former Hoffman brickworks), 72–106 Dawson Street
- Brunswick Fire Station and Flats, 24 Blyth Street
- Brunswick Gas Works retort house (former), 21–35 Hope Street
- Brunswick Market (former), 1–9 Ballarat Street
- Brunswick Road Iron Cottages at 181, 183, 187 and 189 Brunswick Road
- Brunswick Terracotta Works – Ferry's studio office (former), 310 Albert Street
- Brunswick tram engine house and substation (former), 253–263 Brunswick Road
- Brunswick Uniting Church (former Presbyterian Church), 212 Sydney Road
- Christ Church, 10 Glenlyon Road
- Coburg railway line (former). The heritage curtail is extensive that includes seven distinct precincts that contain nineteenth century station buildings and platforms at Coburg, Moreland, Jewell, and Brunswick, substations, signal boxes, gatekeepers cabins, remnant interlocking and safe-working equipment, levers and rodding, signals, gates and industrial sidings.
- Craig and Seeley offices and showroom, Hope Street and Percy Street
- Hooper's Store, 463–475 Sydney Road, now the Hardwick Building
- Melville's Grain Store (former), 1–7 and 9–17 Colebrook Street
- Residence, 120 Stewart Street
- Wesleyan Church and Sunday School (former), 340–350 Sydney Road
- Whitby house, 28 Whitby Street

== See also ==
- List of places on the Victorian Heritage Register in the City of Merri-bek
