= St Linus' Anglican Church =

Church and pipe organ in Melbourne, Australia

- Location of the church in Greater Metropolitan Melbourne
- St Linus' Anglican Church
- 37°43′18″S 144°57′32″E
- Location: 21 Glenydon Avenue, Coburg North, Melbourne, Victoria
- Country: Australia
- Denomination: Anglican Church of Australia
- Website: matthewlinus.org.au

History
- Status: Parish church
- Dedication: Pope Linus

Architecture
- Functional status: Active
- Architects: Charles Heath (1932); Vanne Trompf (1978)
- Architectural type: Church
- Completed: 1932; 94 years ago

Specifications
- Materials: Bricks; steel; glass

Administration
- Diocese: Melbourne
- Parish: Will Will Rook

Clergy
- Vicar: Rev. Mecka Ogunde

Moyle Pipe Organ
- Type: Pipe organ

History
- Built: c. 1850 – c. 1855
- Built by: James Moyle

Site notes
- Material: Timber
- Restored: 1985 (installed in St Linus')
- Owner: National Trust of Australia (Victoria) (since 1978)
- Website: ohta.org.au

Victorian Heritage Register
- Official name: Moyle Pipe Organ
- Type: Registered object
- Designated: 12 June 2008
- Reference no.: H2159
- Heritage overlay no.: HO86
- Category: Religion

St Linus' Anglican Church, also called St Linus Merlynston, is an Anglican parish church, located at 21 Glenydon Avenue, Coburg North, an inner northern suburb of Melbourne, in Victoria, Australia. The church was built in 1932.

Built in c. 1850 – c. 1855, the church's pipe organ, believed to be the oldest extant pipe organ in Victoria, was added to the Victorian Heritage Register on 12 June 2008 in recognition of its historical and social significance; and was also added to a non-statutory list by the Victorian branch of the National Trust on 23 February 1989.

== Church building and parish ==
The nave of St Linus' Church was designed by Charles Heath and built in 1932. It was planned as the first section of a most imposing building which, when complete, would have included transepts, a central tower and spire, and a sanctuary. These later sections were never completed. In 1978, Vanne Trompf redesigned the church building, reversing the original orientation so that the congregation faced west, towards an ambulatory. The crossing arch was filled with a striking steel and glass structure which houses the baptistry, The building is notable for its absence of ornamentation and lofty, well-proportioned interior. It is the only known example of Heath's church architecture, although he carried out considerable work at nearby Fawkner Crematorium.

The church is part of the Parish of Will Will Rook, that also comprises St Matthew's, Glenroy, in the Diocese of Melbourne.

== Pipe organ ==
=== History ===
The organ was built by James Moyle of Ivy Cottage, High Street, Prahran, presumably for private use in c. 1850 – c. 1855. Moyle, who began work in Melbourne in 1848, was among the first organ builders in Melbourne, and is the only known surviving example of his work. Little is known of the history of the organ; however, it is likely to have been built for a private home, and it may have been at one stage in the home of Miss D. Matthews, 'Bonham', 290 Clarke Street, Northcote. (Note: See remarks by John Maidment, 27 August 2008, where he refutes that the organ may have been in St John's Anglican Church, Horsham.)

By 1930 it was in St Cuthbert's Anglican Church, Brunswick, and was removed in about 1975 and stored at Christ Church, Brunswick. In 1978 it was given by the Brunswick parish to the Victorian branch of the National Trust. Prime Minister Bob Hawke launched a fund-raising appeal in 1983 to assist with the restoration of the organ, facilitated by the Organ Historical Trust of Australia. In 1985, following the restoration, the organ was placed in St Linus' Anglican Church, on permanent loan from the National Trust.

=== Description ===
The Moyle organ is a small musical instrument of chamber organ dimensions, with a distinctive Gothic-style case. There are three flats of gilded wooden dummy pipes placed within three cusped arches on the front of the instrument. The cornice of the case is boldly crenellated and the music desk, carved in oak, incorporates a lyre motif. The casework is of pine which has been stained and finished to resemble cedar, although the latter material has been used for the keyboard assembly. The hood moulds above the three cusped arches were at some stage removed and have been replaced. The original builder's nameplate survives. The wooden pipework bears the impressed mark 'J. Moyle', but the metal pipework was almost certainly imported.

The restoration of the windchest, including the fitting of a new table, bellows, action and pipework, was carried out by George Fincham & Sons of Richmond; and the casework was restored by George Vlahiogannis of Northcote.

The Moyle organ has social significance for its continuing role in aiding religious worship in Victoria since the early days of Colonial settlement.

== See also ==
- List of pipe organs
- List of places on the Victorian Heritage Register in the City of Merri-bek
