= Brunswick tram engine house and substation =

Tram transport infrastructure building in Melbourne, Victoria, Australia

- Location within Melbourne

General information
- Status: Completed
- Type: Tram engine house and electrical substation
- Location: 253–263 Brunswick Road, Brunswick, Melbourne, Victoria, Australia
- Coordinates: 37°46′37″S 144°57′35″E
- Year built: 1887–1925
- Completed: 1887; 139 years ago; 1925 (electrification)
- Closed: 11 January 1936 (de-commissioned)
- Cost: £9,387

Height
- Tip: 47 m (154 ft) (chimney)

Technical details
- Material: Polychromatic bricks; concrete; hipped corrugated iron; bluestone foundations
- Floor count: 2

Design and construction
- Main contractor: J. Sutherland

Victorian Heritage Register
- Official name: Former Cable Tram Engine House and Tram Substation
- Type: Registered place
- Criteria: A, B, C, D
- Designated: 12 December 2013
- Reference no.: H2332
- Heritage overlay no.: HO41
- Categories: Utilities - Electricity; Transport - Tramways

The Brunswick tram engine house and substation is a former tram engine house and electrical substation, located at 253–263 Brunswick Road, in Brunswick, an inner northern suburb of Melbourne, in Victoria, Australia. The complex was built in stages between 1887 and 1925. The engine house was de-commissioned in 1925 and the substation was decommissioned in 1936.

The building, located on the traditional lands of the Wurundjeri people and principally repurposed as a tyre workshop, was added to the Victorian Heritage Register on 12 December 2013 in recognition of its historical and archaeological significance.

== History ==
=== Cable trams ===
The Melbourne Tramways Trust (MTT) was established in 1883 and comprised representatives of various local government municipalities in inner-city Melbourne. The MTT built cable lines and engine houses between 1884 and 1891 and remained owner of the lines and installations until dissolution of the MTT in June 1916. Melbourne Tramway & Omnibus Co. Ltd., a separate company, leased and operated the tram system. Their successors were the Melbourne Tramway Board (c.1916-1918) and then the Melbourne and Metropolitan Tramways Board (M&MTB) from 1918.

When complete, there were seventeen routes on the cable tram network. The engine houses were located near the midpoint of a route and the depots at the terminus. In 1887, the Brunswick engine house was built on Brunswick Road and a tram depot was constructed on Sydney Road. The preferred site for the engine house was slightly further south on the north east corner of Park Street, but land prices at the time forced the Trust to purchase the present-day site. The Brunswick engine house was often known as the Sarah Sands Engine House as it was near the rear of a well-known hotel of the same name. The Sydney Road tram route was the sixth cable tram route opened by the MTT. It began operation in October 1887 following the route of the previous omnibus service. This service was the longest cable on the cable tram system, extending from the Brunswick engine house to Flinders Street station and return, a distance of approximately 9.6 kilometres (6.0 mi). The cable trams were powered by steam-driven machinery in the engine house.

=== Electrification ===
In 1919, the M&MTB was established to electrify and extend Melbourne's existing cable and electric tram routes. Electrical substations were built to take electricity from the State Electricity Commission energy grid system to power the newly-established electric tram lines. The brick substations took high voltage alternating current (AC) and converted it to direct current (DC) at a lower voltage.

In 1924, a 500-kW rotary converter was installed at the Brunswick site. The following year, a new substation was installed in the northern part of the engine house with an entrance at 1 Black Street and a second 500 kW rotary converter, together with the first converter, were installed in the new substation. From 1925 to 1936 the rotary converters in the substation supplied DC power to the West Coburg tramway and the steam powered engines in the engine house continued to power the Sydney Road cable trams. Other cable tram engine houses ceased operating when the cable tram lines were converted to electricity, and most were adapted to other uses. But in the case of the Brunswick engine house, both cable and electric trams were powered from the same building for ten years.

It is the only known engine house in Victoria which demonstrates the two major stages of the development of tram transport in Melbourne: cable and then electric traction. In 1936 the Brunswick West tram substation supplying the West Coburg tramway was completed. At the same time the Sydney Road trams were converted from cable to electrical operation using DC power supplied by the Brunswick substation. The long southern engine house section of the building at 253–263 Brunswick Road was then decommissioned, with effect from 11 January 1936.

=== Subsequent use ===
A property developer acquired the site and, in June 2025, it was reported that a development application to build a seven-storey apartment complex on top of the former engine house, principally for student housing, was being considered by the local council. The substation was not included in the proposed development plans.

== See also ==
- Architecture of Melbourne
- Brunswick Line (1887-1936)
- Timeline of trams in Melbourne
- List of places on the Victorian Heritage Register in the City of Merri-bek
