= Brunswick Market =

Heritage-listed former childcare centre in Melbourne, Victoria, Australia

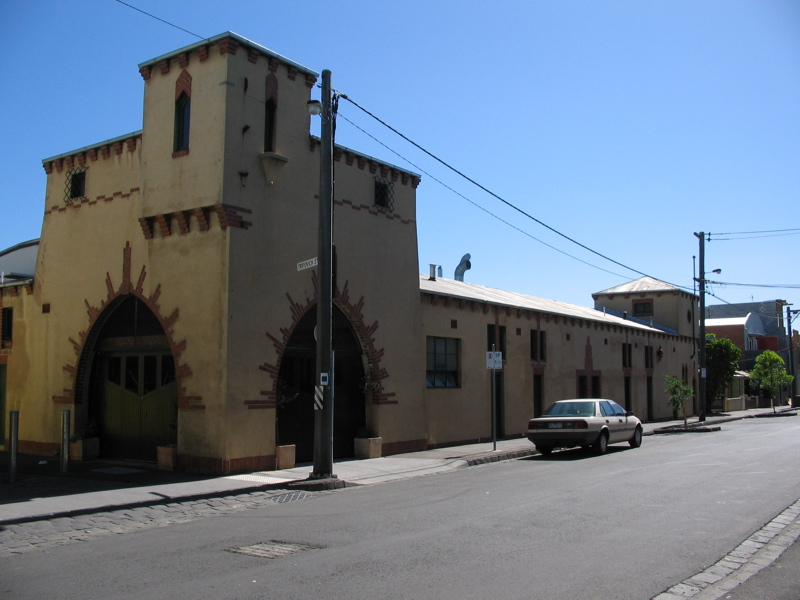
- Former Brunswick Market

- Location within Melbourne
- Interactive map of the Brunswick Market area

General information
- Status: Completed
- Type: Retail and wholesale marketplace (1930–1933)
- Architectural style: Inter-War Spanish Mission; Spanish Colonial Revival
- Location: 1-7 Ballarat Street, Brunswick, Melbourne, Victoria, Australia
- Coordinates: 37°45′57″S 144°57′41″E
- Completed: 19 September 1930; 95 years ago
- Closed: 1933 (as a market)
- Cost: A£20,000

Technical details
- Structural system: Belfast trusses (roof)
- Material: Rendered bricks; timber
- Floor count: 2 (part only)
- Floor area: 3,059 m^{2} (32,930 sq ft)

Design and construction
- Architect: I. G. Anderson
- Main contractor: J. C. Taylor & Sons

Victorian Heritage Register
- Official name: Brunswick Market (former)
- Type: Registered place
- Designated: 27 March 1997
- Reference no.: H1307
- Heritage overlay no.: HO12
- Category: Retail and Wholesale

The Brunswick Market is a former retail and wholesale marketplace, located at 1–7 Ballarat Street, Brunswick, an inner-northern suburb of Melbourne, in Victoria, Australia.

The former market building was added to the Victorian Heritage Register on 27 March 1997 in recognition of its architectural, historical and social importance.

== History ==
In 1828 in England, the Duke of Bedford commissioned Charles Fowler to design a new "basilican" market building at Covent Garden. Fowler also designed two other significant market buildings of similar form, Hungerford, in London (completed 1831), and Exeter Lower (1834). In Australia, expansive marketplaces were built in Melbourne from the 1850s, including at Castlemaine (1858 and 1861), Maldon (1859), the Melbourne Fish Market (1864), Sandhurst (1871), Kyneton (1878), and Queen Victoria Market (1878); and later in Sydney, the Queen Victoria Building (1898). Melbourne's Queen Victoria Market was the only significant open air market, despite its grand facade.

Seeking to retain local shoppers that were drawn to the expansive marketplaces, the first market to open in Brunswick was in 1928, located on Wilkinson Street, in the building occupied by Thorp's chocolate on a much smaller footprint. A purpose-built market was erected in a Middle Eastern or Southern European basilican model that opened on 19 September 1930. Advertised locally as a "Boon for Shoppers", the market promised increased competition for cheaper food prices at a time when the lagging months of the Great Depression were causing a dramatic downturn across Brunswick, a suburb with a heavy reliance on industry.

However, the market failed to compete with nearby Sydney Road traders as well as the Victoria Market, and a liquidator was appointed in 1933. By 1941, the Brunswick Skating Rink occupied the market building. The following year the building was used for storage by the Red Cross Society who continued to occupy the former market building until the early 1950s. Holeproof Limited became the next owner, until May 1961, when it was advertised for public auction as a substantial single-storey brick factory and warehouse. The property was purchased by Belleland Boxes & Associates P/L, cardboard box manufacturers.

In 2022, it was reported that the 3,059-square-metre (32,930 sq ft) building was for sale, with realtors estimating that A$20 million may be expected. Previous owners included Tony Mokbel, the Molonglo Group — a property developer — and the founder of the Aesop luxury skin care brand, Dennis Paphitas, who acquired the property for $17 million in 2020.

== Description ==
The rendered-brick building, in a romantic and evocative eclectic mix of Inter-War Spanish Mission and Spanish Colonial Revival styles, was designed by I. G. Anderson architect, and constructed by Geelong timber merchants J. C. Taylor & Sons Pty Ltd for A£20,000.

The former Brunswick Market comprised 71 shops and stalls for the sale of fruit, vegetables, meat and fish. It contained Melbourne's first self-service grocery shop, and was operated by S. E. Dickens, a Geelong firm – which was acquired by the Coles Group in 1958 – that operated a chain of fifty-four mostly self-service grocery stores in Victoria.

The former market is of exceptional architectural importance as the only known market building in Victoria constructed in the Spanish Revival style, popular during the late 1920s to mid 1930s in domestic and commercial architecture. The adoption of this architectural style was a clever device to draw public attention to the new market venture, and contrasted sharply with the established linear pattern of Victorian style shops and associated dwellings in Sydney Road. The former market has further architectural and historical importance for its rare timber Belfast truss roof structure, and for being one of few purpose-built market structures surviving from the inter-war years. It is a rare example of the "basilican form" of market building originally introduced by Charles Fowler in his designs for English markets in the early 19th century, and later interpreted in Australia by Edmund Spencer in the Castlemaine market.

The former market building is socially and historically notable for illustrating the perceived importance of markets and market buildings during the Great Depression, and with their failure, the risk it entailed.

== See also ==
- List of places on the Victorian Heritage Register in the City of Merri-bek
- Paddy's Markets
