= Bates building, Coburg =

Heritage-listed former commercial building in Melbourne, Victoria, Australia

Bates building
- Location within Melbourne

General information
- Status: Completed
- Architectural style: Victorian Free Classical
- Location: 400–404 Sydney Road, Coburg, Melbourne, Victoria, Australia
- Coordinates: 37°44′38″S 144°57′59″E
- Year built: 1887–1888
- Completed: April 1888; 138 years ago
- Renovated: 1932 (by G. J. Coles)

Technical details
- Material: Bricks; Kauri pine flooring
- Floor count: 2

Design and construction
- Architect: Sydney Herbert Wilson
- Main contractor: T. R. Spargo

Renovating team
- Architect: Robert Irvine (1932)

Victorian Heritage Register
- Official name: Former Bates Building
- Type: Registered place
- Designated: 9 January 1997
- Reference no.: H1290
- Heritage overlay no.: HO159
- Categories: Commercial; Recreation and Entertainment; Retail and Wholesale

The Bates building is a heritage-listed commercial building located at 400–404 Sydney Road, Coburg, an inner northern suburb of Melbourne, in Victoria, Australia.

The building was added to the Victorian Heritage Register on 9 January 1997 in recognition of its historic, aesthetic, social and architectural importance.

== History ==
Henry Bates was a furniture remover and general carrier who established his business in 1874. Between 1887 and 1888, Bates erected a two-storey brick building containing two shops, a livery stable and a roller skating rink. For the first two years a blacksmithing business was conducted in the shops on the lower floor, and the large roller-skating rink was leased upstairs. Other two-storey shops in Sydney Road had residential rooms for shopkeepers on the upper floor but Bates's building was exceptional in making the whole of this large space a purpose-built roller-skating hall. After about two years Bates used this space to store furniture. He retired from his carrier business in 1914; sold the building in 1920, and died in c. 1924.

In the 1920s it became a billiard saloon, then a physical culture school. During World War I, Bates leased the stabling to carrier, Mayne Nickless, and in 1932 the ground floor was converted into a large variety store for G. J. Coles & Company, and an adjoining small shop. At the same time the upper level became the short-lived Taj Mahal dance hall, and murals depicting exotic Indian scenes were painted on the walls and proscenium. This was the second decorative scheme to cover the walls of the hall, the first being for the roller-skating rink which is still discernible under the present painted surface. Coles's remained in the building until 1954. The building was subsequently leased to The Two Dollar Shop company, with frontage to Russell Street.

== Description ==
Designed by Sydney Herbert Wilson in the Victorian Free Classical style, the building was built by T. R. Spargo of North Melbourne. The two shops flanked a central carriageway, which provided access to the stables behind. The upper level, constructed as one large open space spanned with delicate metal portal frames, and a timber board mansard ceiling, was used as the skating rink. On the building's parapet the words "H. Bates General Carriers Established 1874" were displayed.

The Bates building is of architectural importance as a most unusual combination of purpose-built roller-skating rink, shops and livery stables. The upper floor skating-hall remains exceptional as a large space spanned by arched metal portal frames supporting the main roof. This form of framing is rare. The cement modelled horse heads features on the building's facade and the decorative wheel motifs below the first floor windows, are pertinent references to the building's original use as livery stables previously located on the ground floor.

The Bates building hall is historically and socially important as a rare example of a nineteenth-century roller-skating rink, a type of recreational facility once phenomenally popular in Melbourne, when skating for both men and women, both young and old, rivalled cricket and football as a leisure activity. The building hall interior is aesthetically significant for its ability to demonstrate a sequence in popular recreational trends associated with the worldwide craze for roller-skating in the 1880s, and jazz culture between the wars. The Middle Eastern-inspired murals painted in a free-form vernacular style reflect the mood of popular dance culture of the inter-war period and its fascination with exotica. The more formal decorative scheme associated with the hall's use as a skating rink, which can still be discerned through parts of the present scheme, is important for its potential to yield information on nineteenth-century interior design and popular taste.

== See also ==
- List of places on the Victorian Heritage Register in the City of Merri-bek
