= The American Cottage =

Heritage-listed house in Melbourne, Victoria, Australia

American Cottage
- Location within Melbourne

General information
- Status: Completed
- Type: House
- Architectural style: Victorian Carpenter Gothic
- Location: 21 Station Street, Coburg, Melbourne, Victoria, Australia
- Coordinates: 37°45′12″S 144°57′40″E
- Year built: 1885–1886
- Completed: 1885; 141 years ago
- Client: Abraham Tyler Thomson

Technical details
- Material: Weatherboard; timber

Design and construction
- Main contractor: Shargo

Victorian Heritage Register
- Official name: The American Cottage
- Type: Registered place
- Designated: 9 October 1974
- Reference no.: H0139
- Heritage overlay no.: HO146
- Category: Residential buildings (private)

Register of the National Estate
- Official name: The American Cottage
- Type: Defunct register
- Designated: 21 March 1978
- Reference no.: 5579

The American Cottage is a heritage-listed house at 21 Station Street, Coburg, an inner northern suburb of Melbourne, Australia.

The building was added to the Victorian Heritage Register on 9 October 1974 in recognition of its architectural significance; and, on 21 March 1978, was also added to the non-statutory and now defunct Register of the National Estate.

== History ==
The American Cottage was erected sometime between c. 1885 and c. 1886 by a local builder, Shargo, for Abraham Tyler Thomson, from the West Coast, United States and his Canadian-born wife. The house was owned by the Thomsons until 1920. It is believed to have been subdivided internally in the 1940s – a door on the upper level of the north facade is evidence of the separate entry to the upper accommodation.

== Description ==
In overall form the cottage is closely related to early American examples of the Victorian Carpenter Gothic idiom of the late nineteenth century and it is derivative in expression of American weatherboard house traditions. Clad in weatherboard, the house is a one storey timber-framed attic house. The main facade is symmetrical about the centre-front gable, the upper level of which opens onto a rectangular balcony which projects to form a porch over the front door directly below. The internal joinery detailing is generally well preserved. The general layout of the ground and first floor appear to be relatively original. Some alterations have occurred to the rear of the building where utilities and other rooms have been added. The lounge room has the most original finishes.

The American Cottage is architecturally significant as an example of American influence in an Australian setting. It is a rare example in Victoria of the direct translation of the American timber house traditions to the Australian suburb context and it is notable for the finely executed barge boards and overall romantic picturesque qualities of the design.

== See also ==
- Architecture of Melbourne
- List of places on the Victorian Heritage Register in the City of Merri-bek
