= Wesleyan Church and Sunday School, Brunswick =

Former church in Melbourne, Victoria, Australia

Wesleyan Church and Sunday School (former)
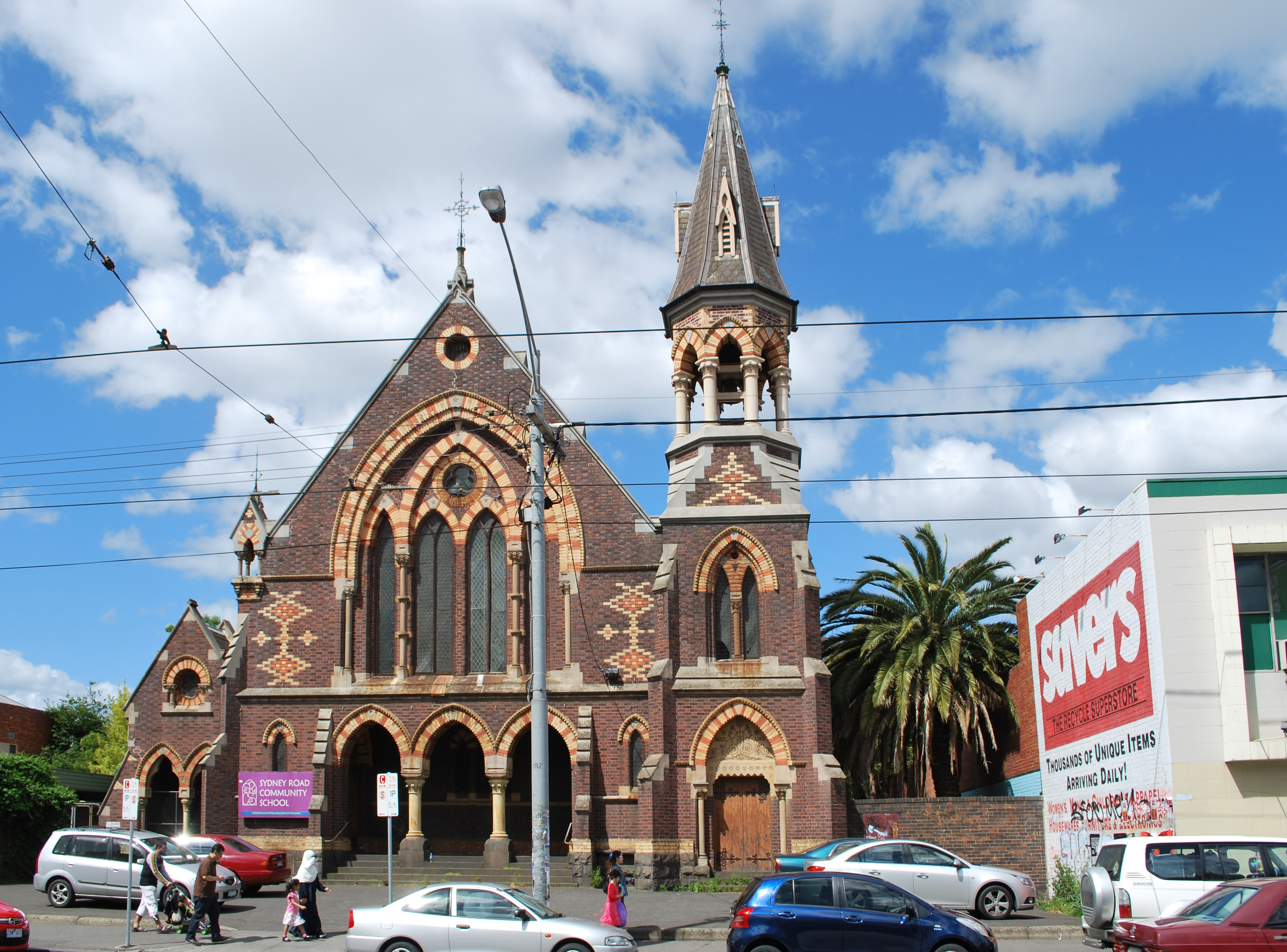
- The former church in 2012, when leased as a school

- Location of the former church in Greater Metropolitan Melbourne
- 37.7698°S 144.9619°E
- Location: 340-350 Sydney Road, Brunswick, Melbourne, Victoria
- Country: Australia
- Previous denomination: Wesleyan Methodist Church

History
- Status: Church and Sunday school (1872–c. 1970s); State-run high school (1972–2023); Profane use (since 2023)
- Founder: Wesleyan Methodist Church of Australia

Architecture
- Functional status: Closed (as a church)
- Architects: Percy Oakden (1972); Alfred Dunn (1880s)
- Architectural type: Church and church hall
- Style: Gothic Revival; Romanesque Revival
- Completed: Church: 1872; 154 years ago; Hall: 1880s

Specifications
- Materials: Polychrome brickwork; bluestone

Victorian Heritage Register
- Official name: Former Wesleyan Church and Model Sunday School
- Type: Registered place
- Designated: 25 January 1996
- Reference no.: 1144
- Heritage overlay no.: 157
- Category: Religion

The Wesleyan Church and Sunday School is a former church and church hall, located on Sydney Road in Brunswick, an inner northern suburb of Melbourne, in Victoria, Australia. The church was built in 1872, and its church hall, completed in the late 1880s. The structures were used for religious purposes by the Wesleyan Methodist Church until the 1970s; and then subsequently used as a state-run high school for fifty years. Privately-owned, the buildings have been used for commercial purposes since 2023.

The site was added to the Victorian Heritage Register on 25 January 1996 in recognition of its architectural and historical significance.

== History ==
The church was built in 1872, designed by Percy Oakden in the Gothic Revival style. The church hall, used as a Sunday school, was completed in the late 1880s, designed by Alfred Dunn. Following the formation of the Uniting Church in Australia in the early 1970s, the Brunswick church site was assessed as surplus to requirements and worship services ceased.

The site was leased by the Uniting Church to the Victorian Department of Education for use by the Sydney Road Community School between 2007 and 2023.

The Uniting Church sold the site to a private owner in 2011 for $1.5 million, and the Education Department maintained its lease. From the late 2010s, the site started to fall into disrepair. The school relocated to an nearby site, some 300 metres (980 ft) away on Glenlyon Road in 2023.

In July 2026, repair works to the former church commenced, with plans for it to be repurposed for commercial use.

== Description ==
The building exterior is a towered Gothic Revival design in the French manner, however the polychrome brickwork demonstrates an Italian influence. The church houses an organ and wall-painted banners typical of Italian Gothic (or Romanesque Revival) Revival manner often used in secular schools of the period. The interior of the former Sunday School is a grand two-level space, surrounded on three sides by a cast-iron balustraded gallery from which the classrooms radiate with stepped gallery floors.

The former Brunswick Wesleyan Church is architecturally significant as a largely intact example of the work of the architect Percy Oakden. The building was the first of a series of polychrome churches designed by Oakden, later Terry and Oakden, and it serves as a representation of polychromatic architecture in Victoria. A squat belltower adds massiveness to the composition while the steep slate roof, side buttresses, lancet windows and the brick tracery of the front window have a Gothic character. Internally, arcading and clerestory windows with quatrefoils continue this character. This church is an early example of decorative polychromatic architecture in Melbourne.

In 1886 the church trustees engaged Percy Oakden and Leonard Terry to design the Model Sunday School, however the trustees could not afford the tendered price and a young architect, Alfred Dunn, was engaged in their place. The Model Sunday School is architecturally significant for its consciously innovative design which brought together contemporary architectural philosophies and the teaching doctrines of the Wesleyans. The gallery was designed to bring about the best possible combination of acoustics and vision and the radiating classrooms have their foundations in the panopticon principle, which promoted supervision under separation.

The former Brunswick Wesleyan Church and Model Sunday School are historically significant for their integral associations with the Wesleyans and as monuments symbolising the Wesleyans’ devotion to their church. The Model Sunday School is of historical significance for its ability to express the innovation that the Wesleyans brought to Christian teaching methods.

== See also ==
- Architecture of Melbourne
- List of former churches in Victoria
- List of places on the Victorian Heritage Register in the City of Merri-bek
