= 130 Barkly Street, Brunswick =

Heritage-listed house in Melbourne, Victoria, Australia

- Location within Melbourne

General information
- Status: Completed
- Type: Cottage
- Architectural style: Victorian Georgian
- Location: 130 Barkly Street, Brunswick, Melbourne, Victoria, Australia
- Coordinates: 37°46′38″S 144°58′13″E
- Completed: c. 1850s
- Client: Matthew Birkett

Technical details
- Material: Bluestone; timber; slate; iron; bricks
- Floor area: 118 m^{2} (1,270 sq ft)
- Grounds: 1,009 m^{2} (10,860 sq ft)

Victorian Heritage Register
- Official name: Cottage, 130 Barkly Street
- Type: Registered place
- Designated: 9 January 1985
- Reference no.: H0594
- Heritage overlay no.: HO17
- Category: Residential buildings (private)

Register of the National Estate
- Official name: Bluestone Workers Cottage
- Type: Defunct register
- Designated: 30 June 1992
- Reference no.: 16450

The Bluestone Cottage at 130 Barkly Street, Brunswick, is an historical cottage built using bluestone, located in Brunswick, an inner northern suburb of Melbourne, in Victoria, Australia.

Completed in the late 1850s, the cottage was added to the Victorian Heritage Register on 9 January 1985 in recognition of its historical significance. The cottage was also added to a non-statutory local government list by the City of Merri-bek on an unknown date and on the former defunct Register of the National Estate on 30 June 1992.

The site is located in the grounds of a craft brewery for the Rocky Ridge Brewing Company, formerly the Thunder Road Brewhouse.

== History ==
With its shallow bluestone deposits and rich clay beds along the nearby Moonee Ponds Creek, Brunswick became the city's main source of building stone and bricks in the nineteenth century, located on the city's perimeter, and poorly served by transport facilities until it was not until the boom decade of the 1880s that Brunswick became part of the Melbourne metropolis. Brunswick's rapid growth in the 1880s reflected the intense activity in the district's building trades at this time.

The 1860-61 rate books record Matthew Birkett as the owner and occupier of a stone house on the south side of Barkly Street, consisting of four rooms, a kitchen and stabling. The house certainly existed in 1860 and it seems likely that the building was constructed in the 1850s. There are no rate books earlier than 1860-61 for the City of Brunswick and it is possible that the building was constructed by Matthew Birkett, a quarryman, from the local stone available in the quarries nearby.

From about 1873-80, Birkett let the property to a succession of tenants, including a traveller, a carter and a cabman. In 1882 the property passed to John Melville, a journalist. The cottage was the former home of John George Getrumph in 1899. By March 1900, the last day at which Melville's ownership is recorded, the cottage, with five rooms, was let to Benjamin Brown, a clerk. By March 1901, the property had passed to Alexander Cran Reith, a baker of Lygon Street, Brunswick, who continued to let the property as a domestic dwelling. The brick bakery at the rear was Reith's business premises, demolished in c. 1984.

The cottage sold for A$100,000 in June 1985.

== Description ==
The single-storey bluestone two-bedroom and one bathroom cottage at 130 Barkly Street, Brunswick, is significant as an early example of a Victorian Georgian working man's cottage in an area distinguished by its association with Melbourne's building trades.

The original section of the cottage had a slate hipped roof, featuring scallop slates to the front and a concave iron verandah to Barkly Street. The symmetrical front facade has a central, four panel door and two double hung windows with bluestone quoined surrounds and dressed bluestone sills. The front facade is tuckpointed with shallow courses in contrast to the deeper and more random courses of the sides. There is a bluestone chimney on the east side of the building and geometric cast iron vents still remain. At the rear was a substantial brick building which appears to have been used as Reith's Bakery.

The cottage at 130 Barkly Street is a rare example of pre-land boom Brunswick, and important for its association with quarrying. The brick addition and building material reflects the style of the later period.

== See also ==
- Architecture of Melbourne
- List of places on the Victorian Heritage Register in the City of Merri-bek
