= Glencairn, Coburg =

Heritage-listed house in Melbourne, Victoria, Australia

Glencairn
- Location within Melbourne

General information
- Status: Completed
- Type: Villa
- Architectural style: Victorian; Eclectic
- Location: 6 Craigrossie Avenue, Coburg, Melbourne, Victoria, Australia
- Coordinates: 37°45′07″S 144°57′27″E
- Year built: 1859–1861
- Completed: 1861; 165 years ago
- Renovated: 1882, 1911, and 2022
- Client: Robert Mailer and Isabella Georgeson
- Owner: Mailer family (1859–1953)

Technical details
- Material: Bluestone; timber; stained glass
- Grounds: 3,000 m^{2} (32,000 sq ft)

Renovating team
- Architect: Trower Falvo (2022)
- Awards: Grand Designs: House of the Year: Large renovation (2025)

Victorian Heritage Register
- Official name: Glencairn
- Type: Registered place
- Designated: 12 May 1976
- Reference no.: H0375
- Heritage overlay no.: HO53
- Category: Residential buildings (private)

Register of the National Estate
- Official name: Glencairn
- Type: Defunct register
- Designated: 21 March 1978
- Reference no.: 5581

Glencairn is a Victorian Colonial villa, at 6 Craigrossie Avenue, Coburg, an inner northern suburb of Melbourne, Australia.

The house was added to the Victorian Heritage Register on 12 May 1976 in recognition of its historical, architectural and aesthetic significance. The house was also added to non-statutory lists by the Victorian branch of the National Trust on 9 August 1962, the City of Merri-bek on an unknown date, and the now defunct Register of the National Estate on 21 March 1978.

== History ==
Glencairn was built between 1859 and 1861 as a five-room bluestone house for Scottish-born merchant, Robert Mailer and his wife, Isabella Georgeson. The house was built on agricultural land, previously part of the Moreland pastoral run of Farquhar McCrae, a pioneer Melbourne doctor. The original building was one of the first in a chain of farmhouses along the Moonee Ponds Creek. The Mailers raised seven children at Glencairn, with three other children who died in infancy.

Originally located in the suburb of Pentridge, it was Robert Mailer who, in 1870, proposed that the suburb name be changed to honour an upcoming visit by Prince Albert of Saxe-Coburg and Gotha, the consort of Queen Victoria, the reigning monarch.

Substantial alterations in 1882 and 1911 enhanced the originally unsophisticated early colonial style farmhouse. The 1911 alterations were carried out by one of the Mailer's sons, Dr Melrose Mailer, and has been little altered externally since. In 1912 Melrose Mailer subdivided the property into 50 blocks – with a second subdivision in 1917 – and lived at Glencairn until his death in 1927, aged 91 years. It is significant for its long association with the Mailer family who owned the property until 1953.

The house was extensively renovated in 2022.

== Description ==
Glencairn, of unknown design, built originally of simple Victorian classic revival detail, has been embellished by the addition of a crude monumental porch, delicate timber verandah, roof top widow's walk, and dodecagonal corner turret to create a picturesque, heavily eclectic composition. As a rare surviving 1860s villa to the north of the city, Glencairn is one of the oldest surviving buildings in the early chain of settlements along the Moonee Valley Creek, and property provides an understanding of the history of early properties in the area west of Sydney Road.

Glencairn is of historical and architectural significance as it demonstrates the changes implemented from its simple origins as a five-room dwelling, to its 1911 and 2022 gentrification, all the while in the occupation of the Mailer family. The house is of aesthetic and architectural significance for its architectural composition and its formal garden setting.

Whilst previously located on a much larger holding, in 2022 the house was located on a 3,000-square-metre (32,000 sq ft) site and was extensively renovated in a modern and complementary style. Its renovating architects won the 2025 Grand Designs House of the Year competition in the Large Renovations category.

== See also ==
- Architecture of Melbourne
- List of places on the Victorian Heritage Register in the City of Merri-bek
