= Downs & Son =

Australian rope and twine manufacturing firm

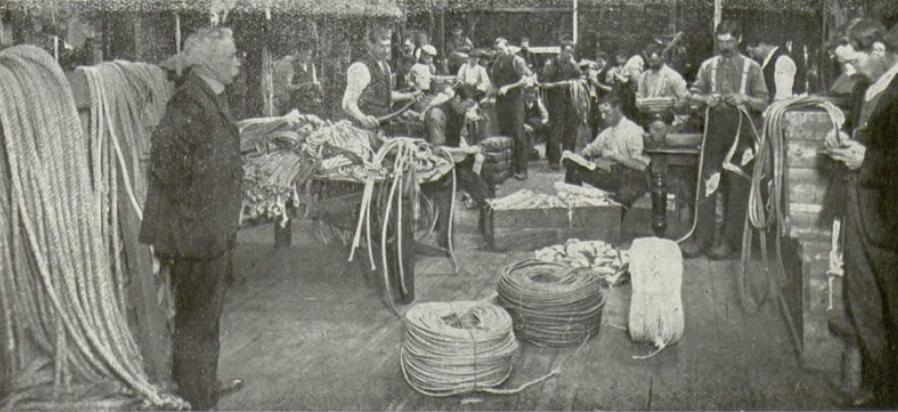
- Founded: 1888; 138 years ago in Coburg, Australia
- Founder: Allen Cavanagh Downs
- Fate: Defunct
- Headquarters: Brunswick, Victoria, Australia
- Key people: Allen C. Downs; John W. C. Downs; Raymond Downs; John T. C. Downs
- Products: Rope, nets, and other cordage goods

Downs & Son was a rope and twine manufacturing firm located in Brunswick, Victoria, Australia, which operated the Samson Cordage Works factory in Brunswick. The factory was the oldest and last surviving rope works in the northern suburbs of Melbourne, and the best surviving in Melbourne.

The firm produced a wide range of plaited or braided cords, threads, and hundreds of varieties of other cordage goods, which were used largely throughout Victoria, other Australian states and territories, and the world.

The former factory has since been converted to apartments, however the structure remains the most intact rope works in Brunswick. It is one of few such remaining works in Melbourne and is listed in the Victorian Heritage Database.

== History ==
The founder of the firm, Allen Cavanagh Downs (1850–1935), was born in Birmingham, England. Downs learned the rope making trade from his father, and began working from age seven with Messrs. Bates of Stockport, one of the largest cordage manufacturers at the time. He later moved to Hull, Yorkshire, where he continued in the rope making trade.

In 1888, he immigrated to Victoria, and worked for five months as a master rope maker for the pioneer firm James Miller & Co. in Coburg.

Later that same year, he founded his own rope works in partnership with Henry Markwald, initially under the name Downs and Markwald. In 1892, he was joined by his son, John William Cavanagh Downs (1870–1944), with whom he established Downs & Son, which replaced Downs and Markwald. John William Cavanagh Downs later succeeded him as managing director of the firm. Downs & Son originally occupied several premises in Coburg and Brunswick, including a site on Sydney Road from 1888 to 1900, and a factory known as Moreland Rope Works in Brunswick from 1892 to 1903 (the latter of which now forms part of RMIT University).

The business rapidly expanded, and in 1903 the rope works were relocated to a factory on Tinning Street in Brunswick, where the firm operated under the name Samson Cordage Works. Brunswick was an ideal location because of its proximity to the city and the availability of large, flat land. The factory had previously been constructed in 1888 for another rope manufacturer.

The new factory in Brunswick was situated on an eight-acre plot, with the factory buildings alone occupying 25,000 square feet (2,300 m^{2}). The firm's offices were located on Cassels Road, adjoining the factory.

After the relocation to Brunswick, the business continued to rapidly advance. By 1905, the factory employed 30 workers, and by 1915 it employed 50 workers, including 23 adults, 15 girls, and 12 boys. In 1907, the firm replaced the earlier timber factory buildings with brick structures, which remain today.

By 1930, with the expansion of the business, the factory floor space had increased to 65,000 square feet (6,000 m^{2}), and by 1936 the floor space expanded to more than 100,000 square feet (9,300 m^{2}).

The firm remained a family business, and employed a predominantly local workforce, many of whom remained in the factory for much of their working life.

=== Modern history ===
The firm continued to operate through the 20th century. As the firm began to specialize in smaller, more intricate cordage products rather than heavy rope, they shortened the length of the rope walk. Other alterations included the addition of a modern cafeteria and social hall for employees in about 1947.

Around 1940, John William Cavanagh's son, Raymond Downs, became the third generation managing director of the firm. In the late 20th century, his son John Trevor Cavanagh Downs became the fourth generation managing director.

In 1975, the firm was the subject of an armed robbery. Three men waited outside the Cassels Road office, and threatened payroll staff with pistols and a sawn-off shotgun, before escaping with $10,567 (equivalent to $84,000 in 2022).

The firm continued to operate until the late 20th century. In 1992, the firm was sold to New Zealand-based company Donaghys Industries, and for a short time continued trading as Donaghy, Downs & Son, however the Tinning Street factory was shortly thereafter permanently closed and converted to apartments.

== Production ==
In the early and mid 20th century, the rope works was one of the best-fitted factories of its kind in Australia. The firm was said to have spared no expense in the importation of raw materials and machinery.

=== Raw materials ===
The firm produced cordage from raw materials, which they imported from almost everywhere in the world.

They imported hemp and flax (phormium tenax) from New Zealand and cotton from America. They sourced additional materials from the United Kingdom, Italy, Russia, India, and the Philippines, including various types of yarn, hemp and flax. In the firm's early years, yarn was imported primarily from mills in Oldham, England.

=== Equipment ===
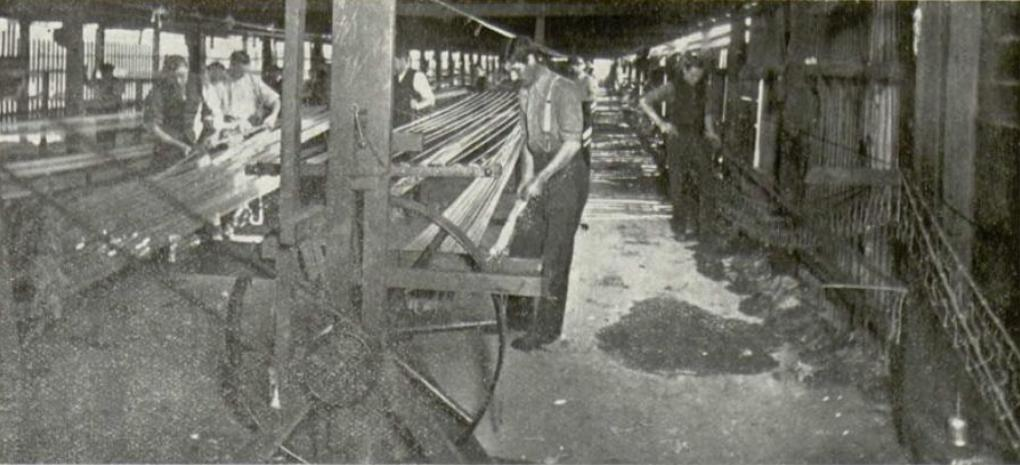
The Downs & Son rope factory in circa 1907.

In the early and mid 20th century, the factory was fully equipped with what was considered some of the most modern, up-to-date and efficient machinery of that time. With an immensely large factory, they had numerous machines that would contribute to various stages in the rope making process.

In 1906, the factory had a rope walk which had a covered-in portion spanning 400 feet (120 m), however it could be extended into the open air when needed, reaching a length of 1,640 feet (500 m). The walk was 50 feet (15 m) wide. This is where lengths of twine were drawn out and twisted on a travelling carriage. The rope walk was shortened when the firm began to specialize in smaller cordage products such as fishing line, halters, and twine.

The firm dealt with various kinds of yarn, which they would sometimes spin themselves. The factory also had the capability of dyeing on premises if needed.

In 1906, the factory had a maypole braiding machine to wind and braid strands of cord together. The machine would wind up eight strands of cord and plait them into a unified product, which was passed over a pulley and wound into coils. The factory also had a machine where hemp was dressed with bristles or combs, spun into strands, and then combined to make a three or four strand rope.

Another machine was used for the final dressing of the rope, or, as Allan C. Downs described it, "shaving the whiskers off". The particulars of this machine were a trade secret in the early 20th century.

== Products ==
The firm manufactured all classes of cordage, from the finest quality twine to the largest of ropes. They sold significant quantities of products in every Australian state, as well as overseas.

Although the company's chief product was rope and twine, the firm produced hundreds of varieties of other cordage goods. The firm manufactured nets, reins, butcher's twine, animal rugs, chalk lines, horse ties, hammocks, blind cords, fishing lines, tennis nets, halters, and parachute cords.

The company also sold goods that were new concepts to Australia, and goods that were the firm's own invention.

In the early 20th century, the firm stopped manufacturing rope, and specialized in smaller cordage products, including twine, sewing threads, sash cords, and fishing lines. In about 1960, the firm began producing plaited candle wick.

=== Goods supplied to governments ===
In addition to producing goods for businesses and the general public, the firm fulfilled orders from governments in Australia and overseas. The company also received orders from monarchs and dynasties including the Sultan of Morocco and the Sultan of Johor.

The firm supplied halters to the Victorian Government for cavalry during the Second Boer War in South Africa, when the troops took home horses for the Victorian contingents of mounted infantry. They also supplied halters to the governments of India and the British Empire.

The firm made the special whip cord that was used by the flagellator at Pentridge, an early Australian prison in Coburg.

== Brand controversy ==
The firm sold their products under three brand names "Samson", "Lion" and "Security". These names led to a dispute with the American cordage manufacturer Samson Cordage Works, which was based in Boston, Massachusetts.

The American company brought a lawsuit against Downs & Son in 1924, alleging trademark infringement. The American company claimed that they had discovered that Downs & Son was selling cordage under a mark consisting of the words "Blue Dot", which they argued was an infringement on their trademark and design. They further alleged that the firm had publicly described their cordage as "Samson cordage" and "Lion cordage", and was thereby making large profits at the company's expense.

Downs & Son responded that the American company's trademarks were not valid under Australian trademark law, and that they had been using the brand names and marks before the American company.

The court granted an injunction against Downs & Son in September, 1924, and remarked that difficulties in deciding the case had been added to by the fact that both companies had carried on business under the same name.
