= Wesleyan Methodist Church, Coburg =

Uniting church complex in Melbourne, Australia

Wesleyan Methodist Church
- Uniting Church Second Wesleyan Methodist Chapel; Second Wesleyan Methodist Chapel
- Location of the chapel in Greater Metropolitan Melbourne
- Wesleyan Methodist Church
- 37°44′28″S 144°58′02″E
- Location: 512 Sydney Road, Coburg, Melbourne, Victoria
- Country: Australia
- Denomination: Uniting (since 1977)
- Previous denomination: Wesleyan Methodist Church of Australia (1857–1902); Methodist Church of Australasia (1902–1977)

History
- Former name: Pentridge Wesleyan Methodist Chapel
- Status: Chapel
- Founded: 1849

Architecture
- Functional status: Active
- Architect: T. J. Crouch
- Architectural type: Church
- Style: Gothic Revival
- Groundbreaking: 5 August 1857
- Completed: 1849; 177 years ago; 24 December 1857

Specifications
- Materials: Bluestone; sandstone; rubble

Victorian Heritage Register
- Official name: Uniting Church Complex (former Methodist) corner Sydney Road and Bell Street, Coburg
- Type: Registered place
- Designated: 11 February 1993
- Reference no.: H0962
- Heritage overlay no.: HO164
- Category: Religion

The Wesleyan Methodist Church is a Uniting chapel, and former parish church, located at the junction of Sydney Road and Bell Street in Coburg, an inner northern suburb of Melbourne, in Victoria, Australia. Built from 1849 by the Wesleyan Methodist Church of Australia, it is the earliest known surviving Methodist chapel in Victoria.

The chapel was added to the Victorian Heritage Register on 11 February 1993.

== History ==
In 1840, Thomas Wilkinson, the mayor of Brunswick, donated land on Sydney Road for the area's first Wesleyan Methodist chapel, constructed in 1849 and extended at the north end shortly afterwards. It is the earliest known surviving Methodist chapel in Victoria. The foundation stone for the chapel was laid on 5 August 1857 and the chapel was officially opened on 24 December 1857.

A pipe organ, built by George Fincham, was installed in the chapel in May 1875. This organ was replaced in 1924 with a two-manual organ from J. E. Dodd, of Adelaide.

In 1902, the chapel became part of the Methodist Church of Australasia and, in 1977, part of the Uniting Church in Australia. At some stage the chapel was closed as a parish church and the principal place for workshop in the Uniting Church in Coburg became the Uniting Church Coburg, located at 19 Victoria Street.

== Description ==
Designed by T. J. Crouch in the Gothic Revival style, the chapel is one of three Methodist churches completed in the same style, the others being at Lonsdale Street and St Kilda, designed and constructed between 1857 and 1858.

The substantially intact building is constructed of bluestone with a sandstone facade facing south towards Bell Street. It is one of the earliest extant bluestone buildings in Victoria and amongst Victoria's earliest surviving religious buildings. The former chapel was also originally used as a Methodist day school and is believed to be the earliest extant school building in Melbourne. It was used as a hall by the congregation.

The simple appearance of the 1849 former chapel is representative of mid-nineteenth century Methodist chapels, the design of which is based on John Wesley's teachings that chapels should be plain, decent and economical. The simple design also reflects the Methodist emphasis on the preaching of Scripture.

The building is of note for its unusual random rubble stonework of the walls. The bluestone building adjoining both the former chapel and the church which is used as vestry, store and change room, is of note as an integral part of this complex of buildings. The church, former chapel and adjoining building demonstrate the continued use and changing requirements of the congregation. The buildings also illustrate the changes within the Methodist movement and how these changes influenced church architecture.

== See also ==
- Architecture of Melbourne
- List of places on the Victorian Heritage Register in the City of Merri-bek
