= List of places on the Victorian Heritage Register in the City of Merri-bek =

This is a list of places on the Victorian Heritage Register in the City of Merri-bek in Victoria, Australia. The Victorian Heritage Register (VHR) is maintained by the Heritage Council of Victoria.

The Victorian Heritage Register, as of 2026, listed the following 42 state-registered places within the City of Merri-bek:

Place name	Place #	Location	Suburb or Town	Co-ordinates	Built	State registered	Photo
120 Stewart Street	H1219	120 Stewart St	Brunswick	37°45′52″S 144°58′20″E	1887	21 November 1996	
The American Cottage	H0139	21 Station St	Coburg	37°45′12″S 144°57′40″E	1885	9 October 1974	
Arundel	H1948	42A Ross St	Coburg	37°44′18″S 144°57′59″E	1889	13 September 2001	
Australian Licorice Company; Factory chimney and fire tunnel remains	H1289	342–348 Victoria St	Brunswick	37°46′01″S 144°57′38″E	1922	9 January 1997	
Bates building (former)	H1290	400–404 Sydney Rd	Coburg	37°44′38″S 144°57′59″E	1888	9 January 1997	
Bluestone Cottage (now museum)	H0689	82 Bell St	Coburg	37°44′29″S 144°58′14″E	1864	15 June 1988	
Bluestone Cottage	H0594	130 Barkly St	Brunswick	37°46′38″S 144°58′13″E	1851	9 January 1985	
Brunswick brickworks (former Hoffman Bricks); (Hoffman's No. 2 site)	H0703	72–106 Dawson St	Brunswick	37°46′12″S 144°57′09″E	1884	20 September 1989	
Brunswick Fire Station and Flats	H0916	24 Blyth St	Brunswick	37°45′57″S 144°57′54″E	1936–1937	6 May 1992	
Brunswick Gas Works retort house (former)	H2027	21 Hope St	Brunswick	37°45′51″S 144°57′36″E	1889	17 April 2003	
Brunswick Market (former)	H1307	1–7 Ballarat St	Brunswick	37°45′57″S 144°57′41″E	1930	27 March 1997	
Brunswick Road Iron Cottages	H1151	181 Brunswick Rd	Brunswick	37°46′39″S 144°57′54″E	1854	11 April 1996	
Brunswick Road Iron Cottages	H1152	183 Brunswick Rd	Brunswick	37°46′39″S 144°57′54″E	1854	11 April 1996	
Brunswick Road Iron Cottages	H1153	187 Brunswick Rd	Brunswick	37°46′39″S 144°57′54″E	1854	11 April 1996	
Brunswick Road Iron Cottages	H0665	189 Brunswick Rd	Brunswick	37°46′39″S 144°57′54″E	1854	18 November 1987	
Brunswick Terracotta Works; Ferry's studio office (former)	H1285	310 Albert St	Brunswick	37°46′07″S 144°57′32″E	1887	9 January 1997	
Brunswick tram engine house and substation (former)	H2332	253–263 Brunswick Rd	Brunswick	37°46′37″S 144°57′35″E	1887	12 December 2013	
Brunswick Uniting Church (former Presbyterian Church complex)	H0756	212 Sydney Rd	Brunswick	37°46′21″S 144°57′41″E	1865	15 November 1989	
Brunswick West tram substation	H2397	196A Dawson St	Brunswick West	37°46′09″S 144°56′35″E	1935	13 February 2020	
Christ Church	H0129	10 Glenlyon Rd	Brunswick	37°46′19″S 144°57′43″E	1857	9 October 1974	
Coburg Drive-In	H2218	155 Newlands Rd	Coburg	37°43′23″S 144°58′15″E	1965	23 September 2010	
Coburg Primary School; Infant building and shelter shed	H1709	92 Bell St (Note: The school is located at 92 Bell St. The heritage-listed infant building and shelter shed are located on the southern side of the street, at 83–85 Bell St.)	Coburg	37°44′28″S 144°58′05″E	1910	20 August 1982	
Coburg railway line (former) (known as the Upfield line) (Note: Heritage curtail is extensive and includes the 19th century station buildings and platforms at Coburg, Moreland, Jewell and Brunswick, substations, signal boxes, gatekeeper cabins, remnant interlocking and safe-working equipment, levers and rodding, signals, gates, and industrial sidings.) (Note: Some rail infrastructure is listed on the VHR in the City of Melbourne.)	H0952	Various locations	Brunswick; Coburg	37°44′31″S 144°57′48″E	1884	23 October 1997	
Craig and Seeley offices and showroom	H2026	35 Hope St	Brunswick	37°45′50″S 144°57′33″E	1962	17 April 2003	
CSL collection (Note: Also listed on the VHR in the City of Hobsons Bay and the City of Melbourne.)	H2422	10 Cameron St	Coburg	37°45′15″S 144°57′45″E	1983	20 April 2023	
Fawkner Crematorium and Memorial Park	H2331	1187 Sydney Rd	Hadfield	37°42′43″S 144°57′26″E	1906	13 February 2014	
Glencairn	H0375	6 Craigrossie Ave	Coburg	37°45′07″S 144°57′27″E	1859	12 May 1976	
Gowrie	H0128	63–65 Gowrie St	Glenroy	37°41′58″S 144°56′41″E	1855	9 October 1974	
The Grange	H1297	39 Belgrave St	Coburg	37°44′42″S 144°58′30″E	1854	9 October 1974	
Holy Trinity Anglican Church	H0959	520 Sydney Rd	Coburg	37°44′22″S 144°58′03″E	1848	11 February 1993	
Hooper's Store (former)	H1296	459–475 Sydney Rd	Brunswick	37°45′58″S 144°57′43″E	1908	20 February 1997	
Lyndhurst Hall	H0964	46 Walhalla St	Pascoe Vale South	37°44′59″S 144°56′36″E	1870	25 March 1993	
Melville's Grain Store (former)	H0705	1–17 Colebrook St	Brunswick	37°45′30″S 144°57′39″E	1891	30 July 1986	
Moyle pipe organ at St Linus' Anglican Church	H2159	21 Glyndon Ave	Coburg North	37°43′18″S 144°57′32″E	c. 1850	12 June 2008	
Murray Road Bridge	H1198	Murray Rd	Coburg	37°44′07″S 144°58′35″E	1871	19 September 1996	
Newlands Road Bridge	H1446	Newlands Rd	Coburg; Coburg North	37°44′06″S 144°58′20″E	1865	20 August 1982	
HM Prison Pentridge	H1551	Champ St, Murray Rd	Coburg	37°44′21″S 144°58′9″E	1851	20 August 1982	
Truby King Baby Health Centre	H2042	Elm Grove	Coburg	37°44′26″S 144°58′08″E	1925	11 September 2003	
Wentworth House	H0138	22 Le Cateau St	Pascoe Vale South	37°44′36″S 144°56′10″E	1842	9 October 1974	
Wesleyan Church and Sunday School (former)	H1144	340–350 Sydney Rd	Brunswick	37°46′12″S 144°57′36″E	1872–1880s	25 January 1996	
Wesleyan Methodist Church (former)	H0962	512 Sydney Rd	Coburg	37°44′28″S 144°58′02″E	1858	11 February 1993	
Whitby House	H0546	28 Whitby St	Brunswick	37°45′51″S 144°56′50″E	1850	28 March 1984	
