= The Grange, Coburg =

Heritage-listed house in Melbourne, Victoria, Australia

The Grange
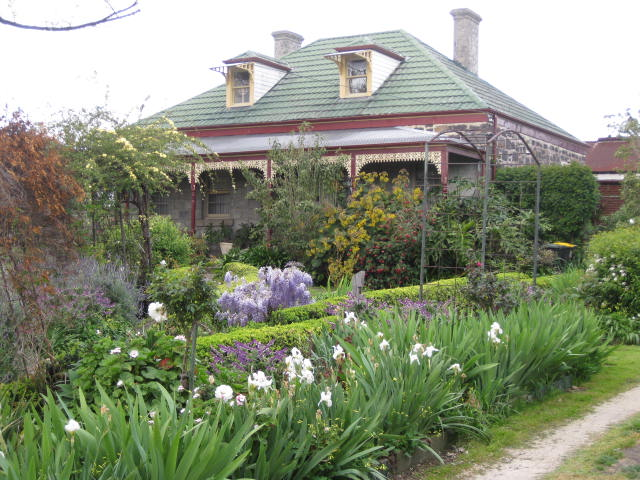
- The house in 2019

- Location within Melbourne

General information
- Status: Completed
- Type: House and former dairy
- Architectural style: Victorian
- Location: 39 Belgrave Street, Coburg, Melbourne, Victoria, Australia
- Coordinates: 37°44′42″S 144°58′30″E
- Completed: c.1854; 172 years ago
- Owner: Peter Virtue (1854–1883); Various dairy farmers (until 1970s)

Technical details
- Material: Bluestone; timber

Victorian Heritage Register
- Official name: The Grange
- Type: Registered place
- Designated: 9 October 1974
- Reference no.: H1297
- Heritage overlay no.: HO20
- Categories: Farming and Grazing; Residential buildings (private)

Register of the National Estate
- Official name: The Grange
- Type: Defunct register
- Designated: 21 March 1978
- Reference no.: 5577

The Grange is a Victorian Colonial house and former dairy, at 39 Belgrave Street, Coburg, an inner northern suburb of Melbourne, Australia.

The house was added to the Victorian Heritage Register on 9 October 1974 in recognition of its historical and architectural importance. The house was also added to non-statutory lists by the Victorian branch of the National Trust on 6 May 1971, the City of Merri-bek on an unknown date, and the now defunct Register of the National Estate on 21 March 1978.

== History ==
Peter Virtue (b.1800), a Scottish-born farmer, merchant, and Baptist lay preacher, took possession of two hectares (five acres) at Pentridge (later known as Coburg) in c. 1839 in liquidation of a debt owed to him. On this site, in c. 1854, Virtue built a regular coursed-rubble bluestone house with an attic and dormer windows. Later known as The Grange, Virtue resided there until his death in 1883.

From 1918 until the 1970s the property was used as a home and dairy, firstly by R. H. Parker and after 1922 by the Sharpley family, who probably built the red-brick dairy building at the rear during the inter-war years. M. P. J. Connell occupied the dairy in 1941 and remained there for the next thirty years.

== Description ==
The Grange is historically important as a rare example of an early rural property that was established during Melbourne's initial subdivision and settlement. The house, standing on a reasonably large remnant of its original farm allotment exemplifies the simple bluestone buildings constructed during the primal phase of the development of Pentridge, Victoria's first rural village. The Grange has continued to survive as a rural property for most of the twentieth century, and the house and later buildings can be read for their sequential changes as they relate to the history of their occupation and function.

The Grange dairy buildings are historically important for their rarity and intactness. They are representative of a phase in Melbourne's metropolitan history when small suburban dairies were a vital component of everyday life. The red brick dairy building, comprising cool room, distribution room and loading bay, the stables and manure heap, the milk cart drive at the rear of the property, and the customer sideway access, demonstrate the functions and activities of a small, suburban milk distribution business.

The Grange has further historical significance for its association with Melbourne pioneer settler, John Virtue. A prominent figure in the early history of the Baptist Church in Victoria, Virtue was an ardent evangelist and was instrumental in the early closing movement. He was also well known in the colony for his large mercantile business.

The house is architecturally notable as a colonial expression of early nineteenth century Scottish vernacular traditions.

== See also ==
- Architecture of Melbourne
- List of places on the Victorian Heritage Register in the City of Merri-bek
