= 120 Stewart Street, Brunswick =

Heritage-listed house in Melbourne, Victoria, Australia

- Location within Melbourne

General information
- Status: Completed
- Type: House / villa
- Architectural style: Victorian Italianate
- Location: 120 Stewart Street, Brunswick, Melbourne, Victoria, Australia
- Coordinates: 37°45′52″S 144°58′20″E
- Completed: 1887; 139 years ago
- Owner: Cornelius Crow (1887–1888); David Morgan and family (1888–1970s)

Technical details
- Floor count: 1

Victorian Heritage Register
- Official name: Residence, 120 Stewart Street
- Type: Registered place
- Designated: 21 November 1996
- Reference no.: H1219
- Heritage overlay no.: HO147
- Category: Residential buildings (private)

120 Stewart Street is a house in Brunswick, an inner northern suburb of Melbourne, Australia.

The building was added to the Victorian Heritage Register on 21 November 1996 in recognition of its aesthetic and historic significance; and was also added to a non-statutory list by the City of Merri-bek on an unknown date.

== History ==
The Victorian Italianate-style villa at 120 Stewart Street, Brunswick was built at the height of Melbourne's boom period, in 1887.

The first owner of the single-storey, double-fronted, eight-roomed brick house was Cornelius Crow. He was possibly a tradesman highly skilled in interior decoration, or had a close association with Brunswick's building contractors. This clue to Crow's identity can be found in the formal front room on the east side of the house. Here in this space of rather modest proportion, is an unusually ornate painted and plastered, coved ceiling featuring seascape and mountain scenes. In the corner of the painted panel above the door can be distinguished the initials 'CC'. Across the hall, the corresponding front room is more ornately decorated with another six painted panels surrounded by intricate plaster mouldings covered in gold leaf. One of the most interesting of these scenes is the very recognisable view of Government House showing its distinctive tower from across the lagoons of the Botanic Gardens. In 1888 Crow sold the villa to local contractor, David Morgan, who may have been the builder for this house a year earlier. The house remained in the Morgan family until the 1970s, after being occupied by a number of tenants.

== Description ==
The house is aesthetically important for its decorated interior which is remarkably ornate for a domestic building of this size, and reflects the late nineteenth century preoccupation with elaborate finishes more usually associated with grander residences. The decorative scheme in the parlour (now lounge) with its coved plaster ceiling, ornate plaster mouldings covered in gold leaf, six landscape panels, and green painted finish, is exceptionally detailed and intact above the cornice line, and is representative of the skill, knowledge and spirit of late Victorian decorators and designs. The scheme in the bedroom, also decorated with six landscape panels, is less embellished, but shows the same degree of skill. The painted scenes are significant for their artistic qualities as well as for their potential to yield information on their locations which appear to be 'postcard' views of travel destinations, notably Melbourne's Botanic Gardens and Government House, and the well-known nineteenth-century view to Hobart and Mt Wellington from Bellerive. The lower walls of these rooms, and the more simply decorated entrance hall have been painted over, but importantly have the potential to reveal more of the original scheme underneath the surface.

The interior is historically important for its associations with Melbourne's lively, late nineteenth-century network of highly skilled crafts and tradesmen, amongst whom the artist and first owner of this house, Cornelius Crow, can be included.

== See also ==
- Architecture of Melbourne
- List of places on the Victorian Heritage Register in the City of Merri-bek
