= Brunswick Road Iron Cottages =

Series of heritage-listed houses in Melbourne, Victoria, Australia

- Location within Melbourne

General information
- Status: Completed
- Type: Prefabricated cottages
- Location: 181–189 Brunswick Road, Brunswick, Melbourne, Victoria, Australia
- Coordinates: 37°46′39″S 144°57′54″E
- Completed: 1854; 172 years ago

Technical details
- Material: Wrought iron sheeting; timber; cement

Victorian Heritage Register
- Official name: Iron Cottage(s), 181–189 Brunswick Road
- Type: Registered places
- Designated: 11 April 1996 (#181, #183, #187); 18 November 1987 (#189)
- Reference no.: H1151; H1152; H1153; H0665
- Heritage overlay no.: HO37; HO38; HO39; HO40
- Category: Residential buildings (private)

The Brunswick Road Iron Cottages are a series of four cottages, co-located between 181 and 189 Brunswick Road, in Brunswick, an inner northern suburb of Melbourne, in Victoria, Australia.

The series of four buildings were added to the Victorian Heritage Register on 11 April 1996 (#181, #183, #187) and 18 November 1987 (#189) in recognition of their architectural and historical significance. The buildings were also added to a non-statutory list by the Victorian branch of the National Trust on 4 December 1980.

== History ==
Constructed in c. 1854, the two pairs of prefabricated iron cottages were built by James Blackburn, Jnr., the son of the designer of Melbourne Water Supply. These types of structures first appeared in Melbourne in 1853, and were imported from England, and the iron sheets were bolted together in Melbourne. Early residents of the cottages included Rev. William Jarrett, the founder in 1852 of one of Brunswick's two earliest colleges and, at least from the 1870s, with John Glew, pioneer colonial brickmaker. Glew's brickworks produced the first white bricks in Melbourne which were used to build the Independent Church in Collins Street.

189 Brunswick Road, restored and renovated with an extensive garden, set on 799 square metres (8,600 sq ft) with four bedrooms, was listed for sale in September 2022 and sold for A$2.2 million. 183 Brunswick Road was listed for sale four years earlier, with expectations of $1.55–$1.7 million.

== Description ==
The cottages at 181, 183, 187 and 189 Brunswick Road have gabled roofs, timber frames believed to be of Asian origins, broad-gauge corrugated iron wall cladding, thought to have been imported from the United Kingdom, and low-height cemented chimneys. These buildings are rare survivals of the iron sheeting prefabricated houses which were so popular in the nineteenth century. The cottages are architecturally significant as an outstanding and extraordinary example of a pre-fabricated iron buildings. The unusual pairing of the cottages is unlike any other pre-fabricated buildings in Victoria. The building is of significance for its use of corrugated iron, later found to be an unsuitable material for Australian climates, which demonstrated new technical accomplishments in construction methods at the time. British technicians developed the galvanising process in the 1840s and this achievement, along with the use of grooved rollers and the fabrication of rolled sections of wrought iron enabled the construction of pre-fabricated iron buildings.

== See also ==
- Architecture of Melbourne
- List of places on the Victorian Heritage Register in the City of Merri-bek
