= Australian Licorice Company =

Former company and heritage-listed former factory in Melbourne, Victoria, Australia

- Industry: Food manufacturing / Confectionery
- Founded: 13 March 1903; 123 years ago
- Defunct: 1985
- Fate: Subsidiary (1969); Taken over (1985)
- Successor: Allen's / Nestlé
- Headquarters: Melbourne, Victoria, Australia
- Area served: Australia
- Parent: Allen's (from 1969)

Australian Licorice Factory
- Built: 1922
- Operated: 1922–1985
- Location: 342–348 Victoria Street; Brunswick, Melbourne, Victoria
- Coordinates: 37°46′01″S 144°57′38″E
- Industry: Food manufacturing
- Products: Confectionery: Licorice
- Buildings: Brick chimney (remnants)

Victorian Heritage Register
- Official name: Australian Licorice Factory Chimney and Fire Tunnel Remains
- Type: Registered place
- Designated: 9 January 1997
- Reference no.: H1289
- Heritage overlay no.: HO183
- Category: Manufacturing and Processing

The Australian Licorice Company was a former confectionery manufacturer, located in Brunswick, an inner northern suburb of Melbourne, in Victoria, Australia. The company was established in 1903 and was a leading Australian manufacturer of licorice products from the 1920s to the 1980s. The company became a subsidiary of Allen's Sweets in 1969.

Its Brunswick factory was built in 1922 and closed in 1985. All that remains is a redundant chimney on a site that was occupied by Nestlé. The former factory remnants were added to the Victorian Heritage Register on 9 January 1997 in recognition of its historic, social, architectural and scientific importance.

== History ==
The Australian Licorice Company Pty Limited was registered as a company under the Firms Act (1892) on 13 March 1903. (Note: Also reported as having been established in 1923.) By September the well-known manufacturing confectioner, Abel Hoadley of Hoadley's had joined the company as a partner. Little is known of the company until 1922 when it erected a new steam-driven factory on Victoria Street, Brunswick on a large allotment behind a row of tenanted shops.

Rival manufacturing confectioner, Macpherson Robertson of MacRobertson's was a joint partner in the establishment of the new licorice factory, and both parent companies used the venture to economically recycle their scrap into a variety of licorice products which were promoted for their health-giving qualities alongside the more glamorous chocolate lines of the companies. Like the large steam-driven premises of Hoadley's and MacRobertson's, the brick licorice factory was conspicuous for its chimney stack.

Over succeeding years a number of rival licorice companies were established but none could wrest the market from the Brunswick firm. By the 1950s another confectionery firm, Rowntree, was a third party in the company. From the late 1950s Allen's Sweets became the majority shareholder and proceeded to expand the premises and increase production to capture 85 per cent of the Australian licorice market. In 1963, it was reported that MacRobertson's had a thirty five per cent interest in the Australian Licorice Company and, in 1969, Allen's became the sole owner, and had increased market share of the Australian licorice market to ninety percent by 1970.

The factory closed in 1985 when Nestlé overtook Allen's, and operated as a chocolate factory. The redundant chimney stands as a relic of the former licorice company.

== Description ==
The brick chimney stack of the former Australian Licorice Company factory is the only known surviving chimney remaining from the steam-driven years of Melbourne's confectionery industry. The chimney is one of a small number remaining from the hundreds of industrial chimneys that were part of Melbourne's manufacturing landscape. The octagonal chimney stack is an example of the skills of the bricklayer.

The former Australian Licorice Company chimney and fire tunnel remains are scientifically and historically important for their potential to yield information that will contribute to an understanding of the technology of steam generation for factory purposes and confectionery manufacturing in Victoria from the 1920s to the 1980s.

The chimney stands as an historically and socially important symbol of the well-known Australian Licorice Company that operated for the greater part of this century and monopolised the Australian licorice market. As a symbol of the Australian Licorice Company the chimney has further social and historical importance for its association with three of Australia's most successful confectionery companies, Hoadley's, MacRobertson's and Allen's Sweets.

In 2023, the City of Merri-bek Council approved a redevelopment of the 7,309-square-metre (78,670 sq ft) site that will retain the heritage-listed chimney and fire tunnel and enable the developer to construct four high rise buildings containing 284 apartments plus office and retail space; due to be completed in 2027.

== See also ==
- List of places on the Victorian Heritage Register in the City of Merri-bek
