= Edmund Spencer =

Edmund Spencer may refer to:

- Edmund Spenser (1552/53–1599), English poet
- Edmund Spencer (chess player) (1876–1936), English chess player
- Edmund Charles Spencer (1896–1999), Australian World War I veteran
