= Brunswick West tram substation =

Former electrical tram substation in Melbourne, Victoria, Australia

- Location of the substation in Melbourne
- Interactive map of Brunswick West tram substation
- 37°46′09″S 144°56′35″E
- Type: Electrical substation (former)
- Location: 196A Dawson Street, Brunswick West, Melbourne, Victoria, Australia

History
- Built: 1935; 91 years ago
- Built for: Melbourne & Metropolitan Tramways Board
- Decommissioned: March 2019

Site notes
- Material: Red brick; concrete; mercury-arc valve rectification equipment
- Architectural style: Inter-war Moderne
- Condition: abandoned
- Current use: vacant
- Owner: Yarra Trams
- Public access: No

Victorian Heritage Register
- Official name: Brunswick West tramway substation (including plant and equipment)
- Type: Registered place; Registered object
- Criteria: A, B, D
- Designated: 13 February 2020
- Reference no.: H2397
- Heritage overlay no.: HO64
- Categories: Collections; Transport - Tramways

The Brunswick West tram substation, also known as the West Brunswick Mercury Arc tram substation, is a former electrical substation located at 196A Dawson Street, in Brunswick West, an inner northern suburb of Melbourne, in Victoria, Australia. The former substation was completed in 1935 and designed in the Inter-war Moderne style on behalf of the Melbourne & Metropolitan Tramways Board.

Located on the traditional lands of the Wurundjeri, the former substation was added to the Victorian Heritage Register on 13 February 2020 in recognition of its historical significance. In 2013, the Victorian Government added substations at Carlton, and Camberwell, and former substations at Ascot Vale, Brunswick, Elsternwick, Maribyrnong, and South Yarra to the same heritage register.

The substation was decommissioned by Yarra Trams in March 2019.

== History ==
In 1919, the Melbourne & Metropolitan Tramways Board (M&MTB) was established to electrify and extend Melbourne's existing cable and electric tram routes. Electrical substations were built to take electricity from the State Electricity Commission energy grid system to power the newly-established electric tram lines.

The former Brunswick West tram substation serviced the former West Coburg Tramway (Route 55) which facilitated the development of much of the western side of Brunswick and Coburg. Operation of electric tramways provided a number of advantages to the M&MTB over cable tram operation, including lower capital costs, greater speed and flexibility, and the ability to extend and simplify terminal shunting.

While power was provided to the West Coburg line from Sydney Road from 1925, there were problems with voltage drop leading to slow and inefficient operation of the tramcars. The 1936 creation of the Brunswick West tram substation on Melville Road overcame this. The refined Moderne design of the building with the prominent display of the large electrical transformer demonstrates the pride felt by the M&MTB in its establishment of a progressive electric tram system.

In November 2019, the former substation was added to the Australian Engineering Heritage Register by Engineers Australia.

== Description ==
The Brunswick West tram substation is a tall red brick Inter-war Moderne-style building on concrete footings, with a flat roof. Its design was typical of early Moderne symmetrical design as applied to a small industrial building. The dominating feature is a central gated opening displaying the high voltage transformer – a perfect expression of the spirit of new technology inherent in Futurism. Attractive use is also made of decorative brick streamlining in classic Moderne horizontal and vertical elements, while sparing use is made of decorative bosses in cream brick.

The substation contains an open three-phase bus bars to bring high voltage (HV) AC power from Dawson Street; 6.6 kV AC switchgear; an air cooled transformer; a choke inductor; a bank of four mercury arc rectifier bulbs in steel cabinets; a 600-volt DC switchboard including automatic control gear and current limiting resistors; a 600-volt DC negative high speed circuit breaker; emergency resistor coils; three outgoing feeders to the overhead tram traction wires via isolators to carry DC power out of the building to the overhead tramway wires; underground cables bringing DC power from the tram rails back into the building and an AC switchboard.

The tram substation is historically significant as a rare example of a substation with all its original equipment still located in the building. It is one of only three substations in Victoria known to retain mercury arc rectification equipment, and the only one which is complete. All the equipment is present and still connected which means that the substation could be returned to operation. The mercury arc bulbs, their matching transformer and some other equipment were made overseas and the automatic control equipment on the DC switchboard was designed and manufactured by the M&MTB.

The location of the substation next to a tram line demonstrates how the DC motors in trams needed to be supplied by a 600-volt DC source approximately every four kilometres in order to provide a stable power supply without excessive voltage drop limiting the tram's speed.

== See also ==
- Architecture of Melbourne
- Melbourne tram route 55
- Timeline of trams in Melbourne
- List of places on the Victorian Heritage Register in the City of Merri-bek
