= Sydney Road Community School =

Government secondary school in Brunswick, Melbourne, Victoria, Australia

Location
- 12-14 Glenlyon Road; Brunswick, Melbourne, Victoria; Australia; 37°46′18″S 144°57′45″E

Information
- Type: State-run high school
- Opened: 1 January 1972; 54 years ago
- Founder: Gil Freeman OAM
- Status: Open
- School number: 8368
- Co-Principals: Irene Savakis; Tessa Abbottsmith Youl
- Years offered: Year 7–Year 12
- Enrolment: c. 100 students
- Campus type: Suburban
- Website: www.sydneyrdcs.vic.edu.au

The Sydney Road Community School is a small progressive state-run high school located in Brunswick, an inner northern suburb of Melbourne, in Victoria, Australia. Despite its name, the school is located on Glenlyon Road, approximately 100 metres (330 ft) from its intersection with Sydney Road.

The school has approximately 100 students from Year 7 to Year 12. Established in 1972 at the height of the alternative education movement, the school has no fees, no uniform and no examinations until Year 12. The school prides itself on being able to achieve success with students who may have struggled in mainstream schools. The school offers the Victorian Certificate of Education, vocational pathways certification, and has strong links to school-based apprenticeships and traineeships. As a consequence of placing a limited focus on academic results, the school often ranks lowly in academic rankings of schools.

The school's inaugural site, and hence its name, was at 340-350 Sydney Road on the site of the former Wesleyan Church and Sunday School. The Victorian Department of Education leased this site from the Uniting Church from 1972 until 2023, when it moved to its current location. The former church site was a heritage-listed property that fell into disrepair under new ownership.

== Description ==
The school was founded in 1972 by local conservationist and activist, Gil Freeman OAM. Upon its establishment, the school was located in a former Wesleyan Methodist small church building and church hall, located in the busy commercial district.

The school attempts to keep class sizes particularly low in comparison to the rest of the state, although this has been hampered by severe funding cuts in the last fifteen years. In March 2023 it was reported that the school had a comparatively high ratio of teachers to students. The school attempts to provide a range of non-academic opportunities, giving strong attention to topics such as art, photography, and music, which assists with student retention and reduces absenteeism.

Due to the small nature of the school site, the school has no recreational or sporting facilities of its own and the school used facilities at the nearby Brunswick Secondary College campus - even after that campus closed in the early 1990s. Staff, parents and students of the school were heavily involved in the highly-public campaign to save the former campus' gymnasium from demolition in 2003, including occupying the site for several weeks, as had been done with the successful Fitzroy High School campaign. They were ultimately successful, with a refurbished gymnasium opening in April 2005.

A deterioration in the building quality at the Sydney Road site led to the Department of Education seeking a lease for a nearby site. Located in 2020 and construction completed during 2023, the school moved approximately 300 metres (980 ft) to its new site on Glenlyon Road.

In 2025, a former male teacher at the school was charged with offences relating to historical sexual abuse of a female student during 1999. The teacher was employed at the school in the late 1980s until the mid-2000s, and again in the 2020s.
