= Brunswick Uniting Church =

Church complex in Melbourne, Australia

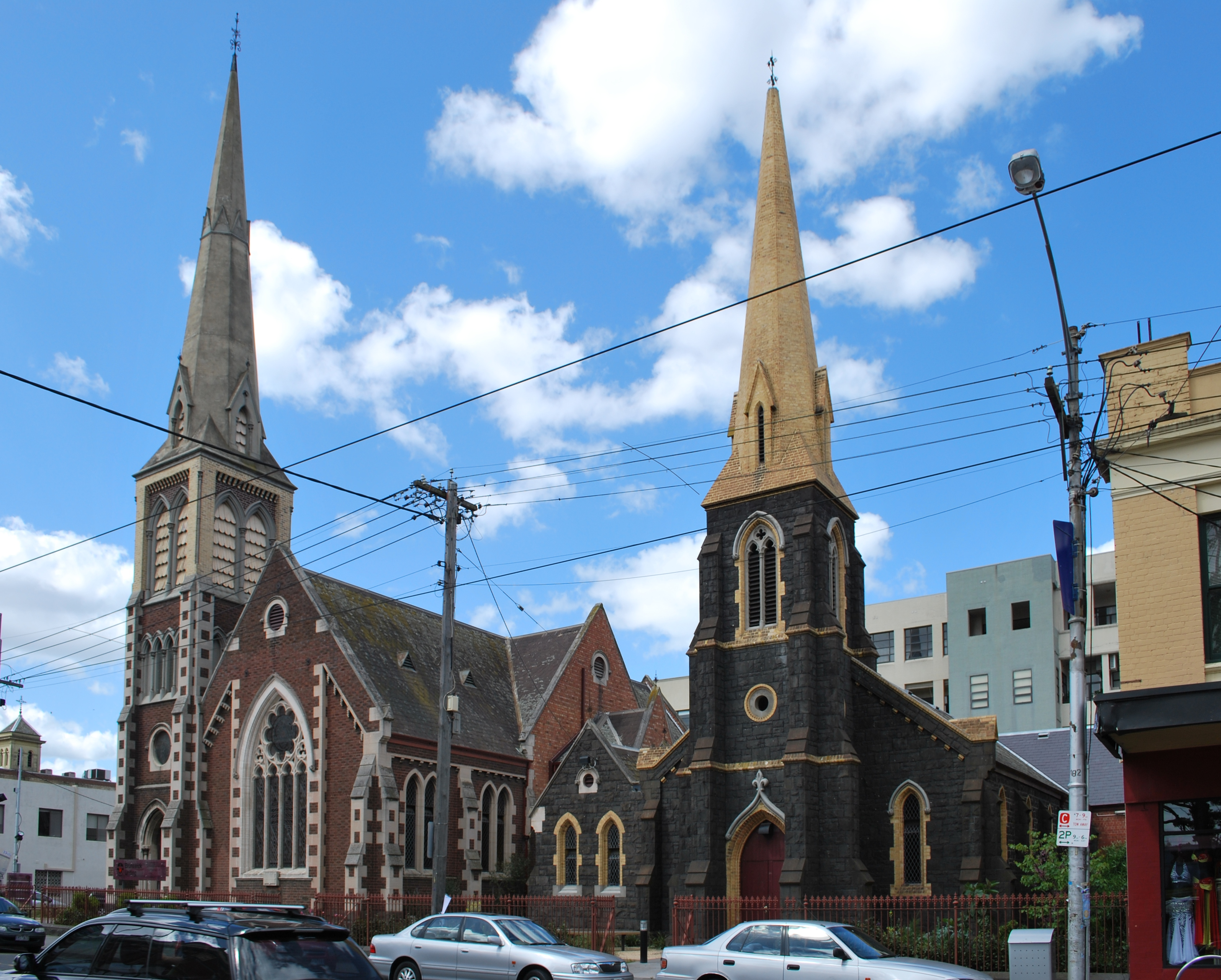
- The church exterior in 2012, showing both church structures

- Location of the church in Greater Metropolitan Melbourne
- Brunswick Uniting Church
- 37°46′21″S 144°57′41″E
- Location: 212 Sydney Road, Brunswick, Melbourne, Victoria
- Country: Australia
- Denomination: Uniting (since 1977)
- Previous denomination: Free Presbyterian Church (1854–1867); Presbyterian Church of Australia (1867–1977)
- Website: brunswick.unitingchurch.org.au

History
- Former names: St Andrew's Presbyterian Church; Brunswick Presbyterian Church
- Status: Parish
- Founded: 23 November 1854
- Dedication: Saint Andrew

Architecture
- Functional status: Active
- Architects: Charles Webb (1865); Evander McIver (1885)
- Architectural type: Church
- Style: Gothic Revival
- Years built: 1865–1885
- Groundbreaking: 2 May 1865; 8 December 1884; (foundation stones laid)
- Completed: 29 October 1865; 160 years ago; 2 August 1885
- Construction cost: £1,430/9/2 (1865); £4,027 (1885)

Specifications
- Capacity: 550 worshippers (1885)
- Materials: Bluestone; stained glass; timber

Administration
- Division: Synod of Victoria and Tasmania

History
- Built by: Messrs Ingram and Thewlis (1865); Mr Thurgood (1885)

Victorian Heritage Register
- Official name: Presbyterian Church buildings (former)
- Type: Registered place
- Designated: 15 November 1989
- Reference no.: H0756
- Heritage overlay no.: HO152
- Category: Religion

The Brunswick Uniting Church is a Uniting church parish, located at 212 Sydney Road, Brunswick, an inner northern suburb of Melbourne, in Victoria, Australia. Founded in 1854 as St Andrew's Presbyterian Church, the parish was renamed following the establishment of the Uniting Church in Australia in 1977.

The church and its associated complex of buildings, comprising two church buildings, were added to the Victorian Heritage Register on 15 November 1989 in recognition of its architectural and historic importance.

== History ==
Worship in the Free Presbyterian Church tradition began in June 1854, with services held in private homes and businesses. The parish of St Andrew's was officially formed on 23 November 1854 with completion of construction of a modest bluestone church building on Brunswick Road. A Sunday School and manse followed.

As the parish grew rapidly, a new church building was planned, located on donated land on Sydney Road. A foundation stone was laid on 2 May 1865. The bluestone Gothic Revival church building was designed by Charles Webb and built by Messrs Ingram and Thewlis at a cost of £1,430/9/2. The first service in the new church was held on 29 October of the same year. The former church building on the Brunswick Road site was sold in 1876.

In the same year, a pipe organ supplied by William Anderson was installed in this church, however, it is no longer extant.

The parish continued to grow and, after acquiring an adjoining site, there was discussion to expand the existing 1865 church designed by Webb, or to build a new church. The latter plan gained favour and the foundation stone for the new church building was laid on 8 December 1884. Evander McIver was appointed as the architect and he donated his services. The third Presbyterian church building in Brunswick was completed in bluestone in a complementary style, built by Mr Thurgood at a cost of £4,027. The first service in the new church was held on 2 August 1885.

The first organ in the 1885 church was built by Frederick Taylor, of Hawthorn, in 1907 and w subsequently sold to Trinity Uniting Church, Balwyn. In 1996, another Taylor organ was installed in the church, from the Presbyterian Church, Kew.

== Description ==
Both the 1865 bluestone Gothic Revival style church, designed by Charles Webb, and the 1885 bluestone Gothic Revival style church, designed by Evander McIver, stand on the Sydney Road site. The 1865 church is a simple bluestone structure designed by Webb and is one of only a few of his early churches that remain extant. The 1885 church designed by McIver used a sympathetic approach to the earlier church by repeating specific design elements. Both churches have broach spires and contrasting window surrounds. The cream brick spires of the bluestone churches are unique and of particular importance in Brunswick, where the cream brick was first produced. Both buildings are essentially intact in form and detail.

Installed between March and August 1885, the McIvor church features stained glass windows by Ferguson and Urie, including a window donated by McIvor in memory of his late wife.

When the Uniting Church in Australia was formed in 1977, the church changed from being associated with the Presbyterian Church of Australia to Uniting.

== See also ==
- Architecture of Melbourne
- List of places on the Victorian Heritage Register in the City of Merri-bek
