= Edmund Charles Spencer =

- Born: 25 September 1896; Adelaide, South Australia
- Died: 26 January 1999 (aged 102); Gnowangerup, Western Australia
- Allegiance: Australia
- Service / branch: Australian Army
- Battles / wars: World War I

Edmund Charles Spencer (25 September 1896 in Adelaide, South Australia – 26 January 1999 in Gnowangerup, Western Australia) was an Australian World War I veteran. He was awarded Knight of the Legion of Honour ("Chevalier de l'Ordre de la Légion d'Honneur"), a class of the highest French order, by French Consul-General to Australia Jean-Claude Poimboeuf on 29 October 1998.

== See also ==
- List of foreign recipients of the Légion d'Honneur
