= Christ Church, Brunswick =

Heritage-listed church in Melbourne, Victoria, Australia

Christ Church Brunswick
- Brunswick Anglican Church
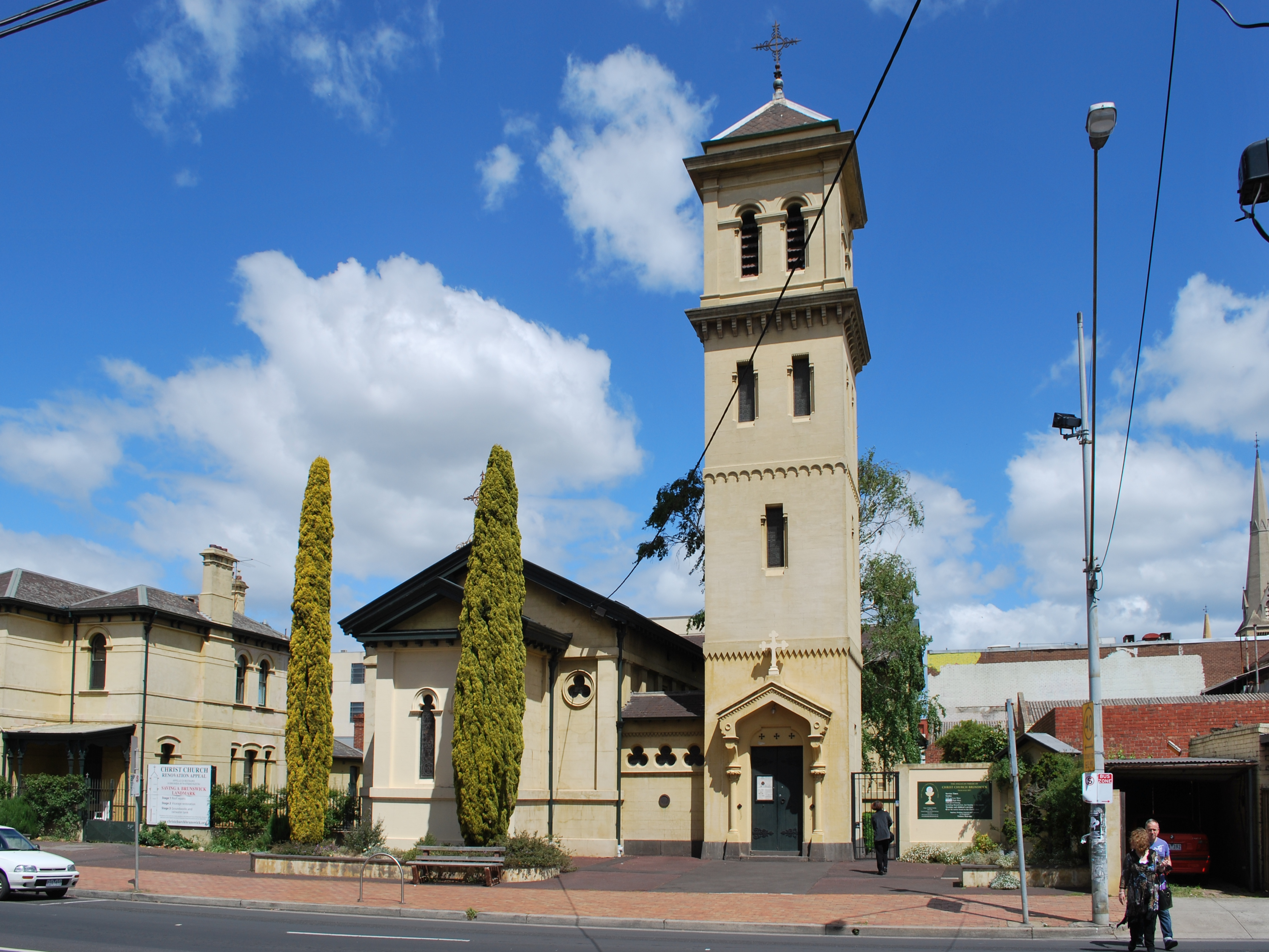
- The church exterior, 2012

- Location of the church in Greater Metropolitan Melbourne
- Christ Church Brunswick
- 37°46′19″S 144°57′43″E
- Location: 10 Glenlyon Road, Brunswick, Melbourne, Victoria
- Country: Australia
- Denomination: Anglican
- Website: christchurchbrunswick.org

History
- Status: Parish church
- Dedication: Jesus Christ
- Dedicated: 1857

Architecture
- Functional status: Active
- Architects: Purchas and Swyer (1857); Smith and Watts (1864, 1871); Frederick Wyatt (1875)
- Architectural type: Church
- Style: Italianate Villa rustica
- Years built: 1857–1875
- Completed: 1875; 151 years ago: 1857: nave; 1864: transepts, chancel, vestry; 1871: campanile; 1875: apse

Specifications
- Materials: Bricks; stucco; terracotta; stained glass windows

Administration
- Diocese: Melbourne

Clergy
- Vicar: Fr Isuru Weliwatte

Victorian Heritage Register
- Official name: Christ Church
- Type: Registered place
- Designated: 9 October 1974
- Reference no.: H0129
- Heritage overlay no.: HO83
- Category: Religion

Register of the National Estate
- Official name: Christ Church, Brunswick
- Type: Defunct register
- Designated: 21 March 1978
- Reference no.: 5550

The Christ Church Brunswick is an Anglican church located at 10 Glenlyon Road, in Brunswick, an inner northern suburb of Melbourne, in Victoria, Australia. Built in stages between 1857 and 1875, the church was designed in an unusual Villa rustica variation of the Italianate architecture popular in Melbourne during that era.

The church was added to the Victorian Heritage Register on 9 October 1974 in recognition of its architectural significance, the non-statutory lists of the Victorian branch of the National Trust on 6 April 1989, and the now-defunct Register of the National Estate on 21 March 1978.

== History ==
The church was built in stages between 1857 and 1875. The nave was designed by Purchas and Swyer and completed in 1857. The transepts, chancel and vestry were designed by Smith and Watts and completed in 1864. Smith and Watts also designed the campanile that was completed in 1871. The apse was designed by Frederick Wyatt and completed in 1875. The pipe organ was installed in 1889 and replaced in 1972.

== Description ==
Christ Church in Glenlyon Road, Brunswick is a stuccoed brick structure of cruciform plan with a detached campanile, where a single bell tolls the Angelus daily. The style of Christ Church is predominantly Italianate with the characteristics of the Italian country house designs found in Villa Rustica, a book on architecture by J. H. Parker, published in 1835. The adaptation of the Italian country villa design for a church building is extremely rare in Victoria.

The church has a number of Ferguson and Urie stained glass windows in the nave, transepts, chancel, baptistery and porch — with the latter including an unusual depiction of the Agnus Dei as a lamb with a lion cub's face bearing the banner of the Cross, symbolising the resurrection. Ferguson and Urie established themselves in Melbourne as stained glass specialists in the 1850-80s. The floor is tessellated at the altar but modern mosaics have been introduced down the nave in the 1950s and timber floors retained on the transept aisles.

The baptismal font features biblical stories carved into it, including a depiction of Jesus' baptism. A small chapel is located in the north transept with a pulpit that features icons of three evangelists by Nicholas Draffin. "The Mystical Supper" was painted by Michael Galovic, located in the sanctuary.

=== Organ ===
The first pipe organ at Christ Church was opened on 24 November 1889. It was initially sited on the right wall of the chancel and it was moved to the right transept in 1898. The façade pipes (including the wooden pedal pipes at the end of the case) were elaborately stencilled. It was rebuilt in 1934 by Hill, Norman & Beard who converted the original mechanical action to tubular-pneumatic with an attached stopkey console. At this time the façade pipes were covered in gold paint. It was removed in 1972 and the parts dispersed.

The present organ was built by Roger H. Pogson of Sydney, and was opened in 1972. It has a solid cedar case of classical design, incorporating burnished tin pipework, and fully mechanical key and stop action. Widely used for recitals and teaching, this instrument has exerted a wide influence upon the music of Melbourne. It was the first two-manual modern mechanical action organ, designed along classical principles, to be installed in a Melbourne church.

== See also ==
- Architecture of Melbourne
- List of Anglican churches in Melbourne
- List of places on the Victorian Heritage Register in the City of Merri-bek
