= Coburg High School =

Location
- 101 Urquhart Street; Coburg, Victoria, 3058; Australia; 37°44′21″S 144°58′27″E

Information
- Type: Public high school
- Motto: Excellence, Integrity, Curiosity, Community
- Opened: 1916 reopened 2007
- Status: Open (Closed between 1993 and 2006)
- Principal: Brent Houghton
- Years offered: 7–12
- Enrolment: 1300+ (2024)
- Colours: Navy, yellow, white & light grey
- Website: www.coburg.vic.edu.au

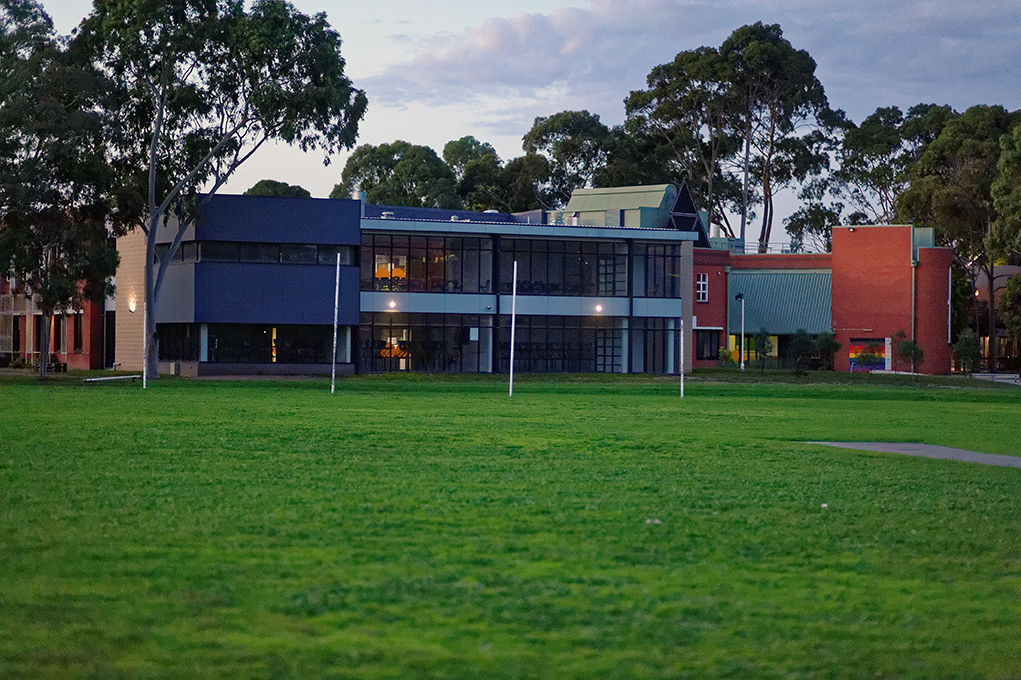
Coburg High School

Coburg High School is a medium-sized, co-educational public high school located in Coburg, Victoria, Australia. The school has experienced rapid growth, increasing from 265 students in 2015 to 1,311 in 2024.

Coburg High School has been an Apple Distinguished School and was one of the first Apple Inc. accredited schools in Australia.

== History ==
Coburg High School began as Coburg Higher Elementary School in 1911, located at Coburg Primary School. Coburg Primary School still exists, with two campuses on Bell Street (Prep to grade 6).

In 1916, a new building for the high school was established on the southern side of Bell Street, opposite the Coburg Town Hall. It opened with Ned Sheehan as headmaster and 195 students. Founded during the First World War, the school was used as an emergency hospital during that time. The first "Leaving Certificate Class" graduated in 1921. Enrolments reached more than 400 students by 1924, 673 by 1955, and 758 by 1985.

Coburg High School was a selective-entry high school from its opening in 1916 until the 1960s. The Air Training Corps School Flight was established at Coburg High School in 1947. The original school magazine was called Echoes. During the 77 years of the original Coburg High School, there were two school songs — "The Best School of All" and "Loyal in All".

After 77 years, the original Coburg High School was closed in 1993 before its merger with Preston Secondary College (formerly, Preston Technical School) in 1994 to become Coburg-Preston Secondary College. Coburg East Primary School was then merged with the Secondary College in 1997 to form Moreland City P–12 College. In 2004, Moreland City College was closed. In 2005, fire damaged the original school building. In 2007, Coburg Senior High School was established as a school for students in Years 10 to 12. By 2012, there were approximately 230 students at Coburg Senior High School.

In 2015, Coburg Senior High School was renamed Coburg High School and was re-established as a Years 7 to 12 school, welcoming its first intake of 160 Year 7 students. In 2016, there were approximately 170 Year 7 students and 160 Year 8 students, and about 60 students in Years 10 to 12, with enrolments continuing to grow.

The reincarnated Coburg High School is located on the site of the former Moreland City College. With the re-establishment of Coburg High School, a state government grant of $3.5 million was allocated to the school for capital works to renovate Building C.

In October 2016, reunion celebrations were held at Coburg High School to mark the centenary of the opening of the original school. A time-capsule from the 1980s was opened as part of the centenary celebrations.
