= Coburg Primary School =

Public primary school in Melbourne, Victoria, Australia

Location
- Melbourne, Victoria; Australia; 37°44′28″S 144°58′05″E

Information
- Other name: Primary School No. 484
- Former names: Pentridge National School; Pentridge Common School; Bell Street Common School; Coburg Common School; Coburg State School
- Type: Public primary school
- Established: May 1853; 173 years ago
- Oversight: Education Victoria
- Principal: Matt Kerby
- Staff: 28 FTE (21 FTE teaching)
- Grades: F—Year 6
- Enrolment: 343 (as of 2023)
- Campus type: Urban
- Website: coburgps.vic.edu.au

History
- Official opening: 30 November 1910 by the Governor of Victoria
- Built: 1910

Site notes
- Material: Red brick; timber; leadlight windows
- Architect: George William Watson
- Architectural styles: Edwardian; Art Nouveau

Victorian Heritage Register
- Official name: Infant building and shelter shed, Primary School No. 484
- Type: Registered place
- Designated: 20 August 1982
- Reference no.: H1709
- Heritage overlay no.: HO22
- Category: Education

Register of the National Estate
- Official name: Coburg Primary (Infant) School
- Type: Defunct register
- Designated: undated
- Reference no.: 18498

The Coburg Primary School is a public primary school, located at 92 Bell Street, in Coburg, an inner northern suburb of Melbourne, in Victoria, Australia. The school was established in 1853.

The school's infants building and shelter shed, built in 1910 on the south side of Bell Street, were added to the Victorian Heritage Register on 20 August 1982 in recognition of their architectural, social, and historical importance; and were also added to non-statutory lists by the City of Merri-bek and the now defunct Register of the National Estate, both on unknown dates.

== History ==
The Pentridge National School was established in May 1853 as Victoria was impacted by a sudden population boom after gold was discovered on the Victorian Goldfields. Its first lessons were held in canvas tent in the outer urban settlement of Pentridge, later renamed as Coburg. A small wooden schoolhouse replaced the tent in Spring of that year, with approximately 200 students by the end of the year.

Work began in 1857 for the construction of new school buildings with brick walls, a slate roof and bluestone foundations, that opened in July 1858. The building was duplicated in 1867 and, in 1874, a third single-storey brick building was erected to form an open quadrangle. Further additions in 1884 consisted of a two-storey brick building with a bell-tower sited in front of the existing buildings. By 1890, the number of students attending the school was 143 and the school was considered overcrowded. Yet, by 1909, approximately 730 students were enrolled at the school; and a new site for the school was acquired on the south side of Bell Street. Despite the new building, opened in 1910, the average number of students attending in 1920 was 1,006.

The senior school, on the north side of Bell Street, was renovated in 1924; and most of the earlier building was demolished to make way for remodelling which gave the two storey building its current appearance. Renamed as Coburg Primary School in 1970, the number of enrolled students was 603. As of 2023, the number of students enrolled was 343.

== Description ==
A new infants building was constructed in 1910 as an extension of the Coburg Primary School. Designed by George William Watson in a mix of Edwardian and Art Nouveau styles, the infant building was located on the south side of Bell Street, with a parapet entrance, constructed of red brick with a central assembly hall and surrounding classrooms. Opened by Sir Thomas Carmichael, the Governor of Victoria, on 30 November 1910, the building cost A£3,500. It has leadlight windows at the front entry as well as the hall and decorative relief panels with native flora and flora on the parapet above the main entry. There is an unusual timber octagonal shelter shed on the infant building site.

The Infant Building is of architectural importance as it is an example of an early twentieth century infants school with unusual decorative elements such as the bas-relief panels on the external name plate and the leadlight windows in the entry and hall. The hall has an unusual variation of ceiling type with its timber double cove section and decorative tie rods and square ceiling vents. The Shelter Shed at Coburg Primary School is of architectural importance as a rare intact example of an octagonal shade structure which demonstrates an aspect of school life. It has an unusual internal umbrella structure and is complete with coathooks suggesting it was also used as a cloakroom.

The Infant Building is of social and historical importance as it illustrates a change in educational methods in Victoria during the early years of the twentieth century when efforts were made to provide buildings to serve the particular needs of very young children.The decorative scheme for the building, and the leadlight windows in particular, represent an attempt to train the children to appreciate the aesthetic qualities of their surroundings.

== See also ==
- List of schools in Victoria
- List of places on the Victorian Heritage Register in the City of Merri-bek
