= Strathmore railway station =

Railway station in Melbourne, Australia

Strathmore
- North-east bound view from Platform 2, September 2026

General information
- Location: Amelia Avenue, Essendon, Victoria 3040; City of Moonee Valley; Australia
- Coordinates: 37°44′37″S 144°55′39″E
- System: PTV commuter rail station
- Owner: VicTrack
- Operator: Metro Trains
- Line: Craigieburn
- Distance: 9.79 kilometres from Southern Cross
- Platforms: 2 side
- Tracks: 2
- Connections: Bus

Construction
- Structure type: Ground
- Parking: 80
- Cycle facilities: Yes
- Accessible: No – steep ramp

Other information
- Status: Operational, unstaffed
- Station code: SME
- Fare zone: Myki zone 1
- Website: Public Transport Victoria

History
- Opened: 28 October 1890; 135 years ago
- Rebuilt: 24 February 1972
- Electrified: September 1921 (1500 V DC overhead)
- Former names: North Essendon (1890-1955)

Passengers
2005–2018 numbers
2005–2006	304,150
2006–2007	325,127 ▲6.89%
2007–2008	350,690 ▲7.86%
2008–2009	347,295 ▼0.96%
2009–2010	370,580 ▲6.7%
2010–2011	371,052 ▲0.12%
2011–2012	342,510 ▼7.69%
2012–2013	Not measured
2013–2014	363,011 ▲5.98%
2014–2015	362,179 ▼0.22%
2015–2016	383,280 ▲5.82%
2016–2017	391,050 ▲2.02%
2017–2018	401,881 ▲2.76%
- 2018–2019: 389,922 ▼2.97%
- 2019–2020: 318,600 ▼18.29%
- 2020–2021: 130,750 ▼58.96%
- 2021–2022: 151,600 ▲15.94%
- 2022–2023: 242,550 ▲59.99%
- 2023–2024: 299,900 ▲23.64%

Services
Preceding station	Metro Trains	Following station
Glenbervie towards Flinders Street	Craigieburn line	Pascoe Vale towards Craigieburn
Track layout
Location

Strathmore station is a railway station operated by Metro Trains Melbourne on the Craigieburn line, part of the Melbourne rail network. It serves the northern suburb of Essendon in Melbourne, Victoria, Australia. Strathmore station is a ground-level unstaffed station, featuring two side platforms. It opened on 28 October 1890, with the current station building on platform 1 provided in 1972.

Initially opened as North Essendon, the station was given its current name of Strathmore on 1 March 1955.

== History ==
Strathmore station opened on 28 October 1890, with the railway line past the site of the station originally opening in 1872, as part of the North East line to School House Lane. The station, like the suburb itself, was named after a Presbyterian church which opened in 1936. The church was named by local settler Thomas Napier, who had a property named Rosebank in the area. The Strathmore name comes from a valley in Scotland, near where Napier was born.

Located at the point where the original Sydney Road (now Pascoe Vale Road) crossed the railway line via a level crossing, it was considered one of the worst traffic bottlenecks in Melbourne, until grade separation works were completed in 1964.

In 1965, a number of signals at the station were abolished, in conjunction with the replacement of double line block signalling with three position signalling between Broadmeadows and Essendon.

On 24 February 1972, the present station building on Platform 1 was provided.

== Platforms and services ==
Strathmore has two side platforms. It is served by Craigieburn line trains.

Strathmore platform arrangement
Platform	Line	Destination	Via	Service Type	Notes	Source
1	Craigieburn line	Flinders Street	City Loop	All stations	See City Loop for operating patterns	
2	Craigieburn line	Craigieburn		All stations		

== Transport links ==
Two bus routes operate via Strathmore station, under contract to Public Transport Victoria:

- 469 : Moonee Ponds Junction – Keilor East (operated by CDC Melbourne)
- 512 : to East Coburg (operated by Kinetic Melbourne)

== Gallery ==
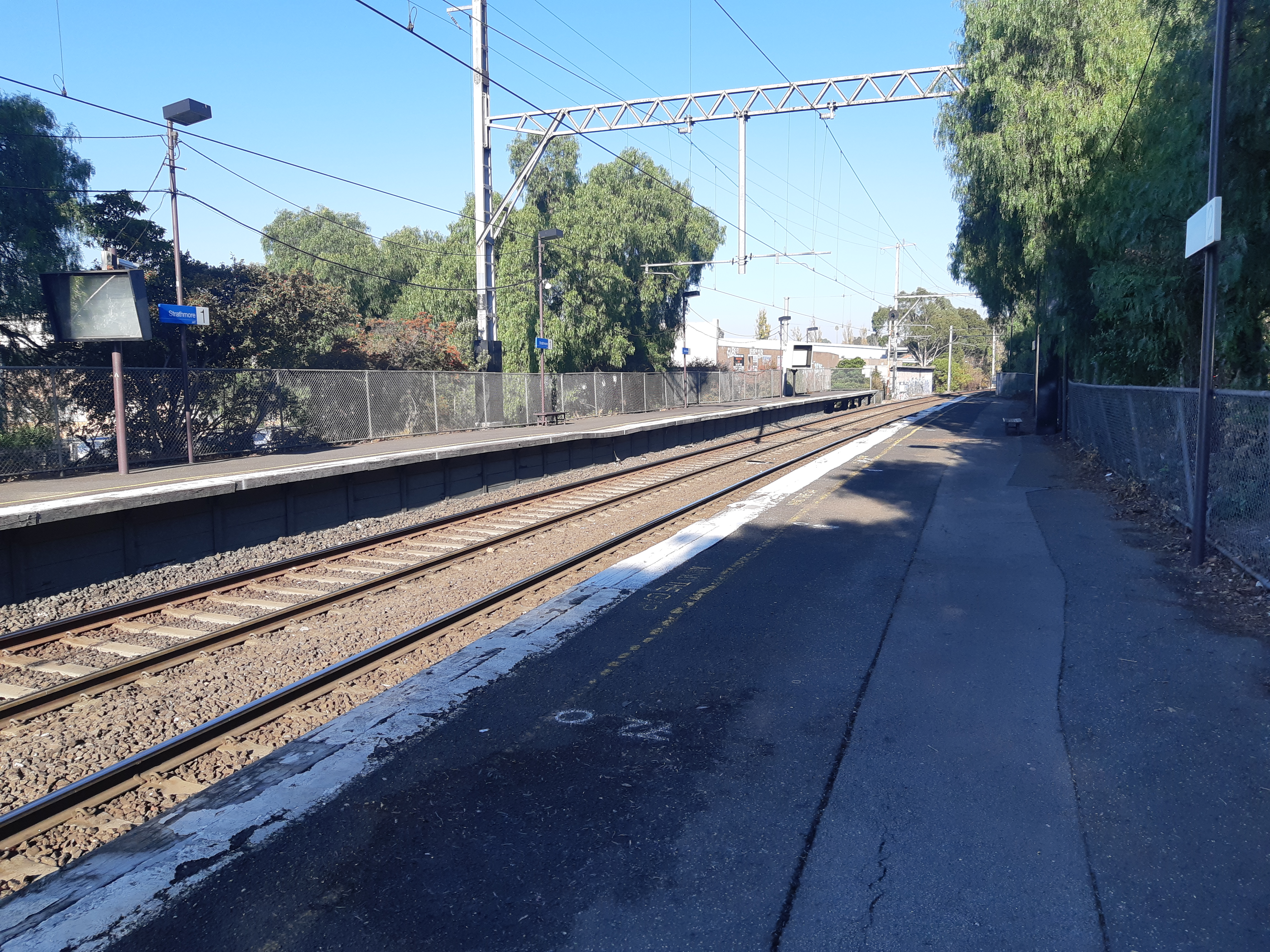
Southbound view from Platform 2, May 2019

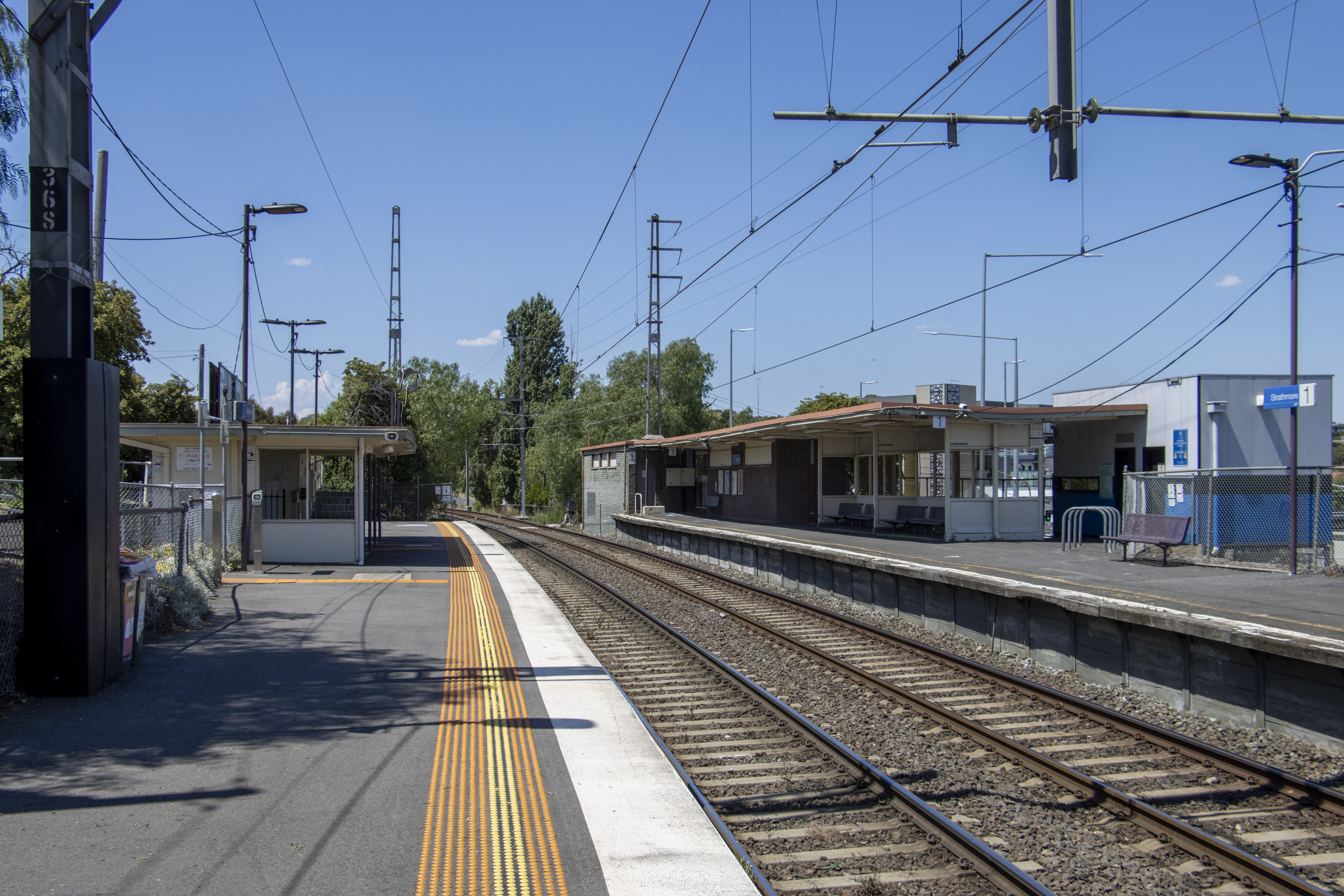
Northbound view from Platform 2, December 2022

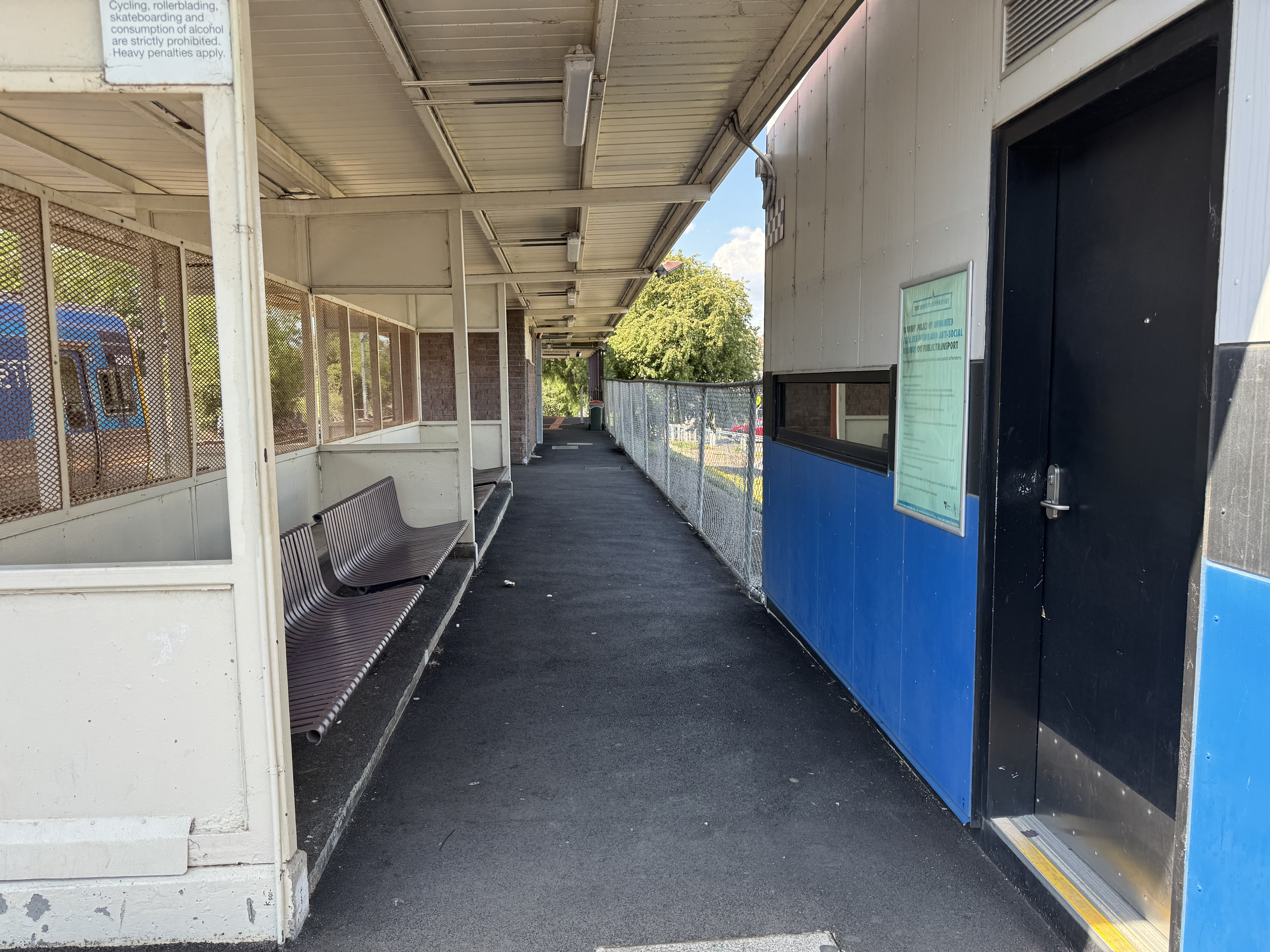
Partial view of the PSO box and seating area at the northern end of Platform 1, November 2024

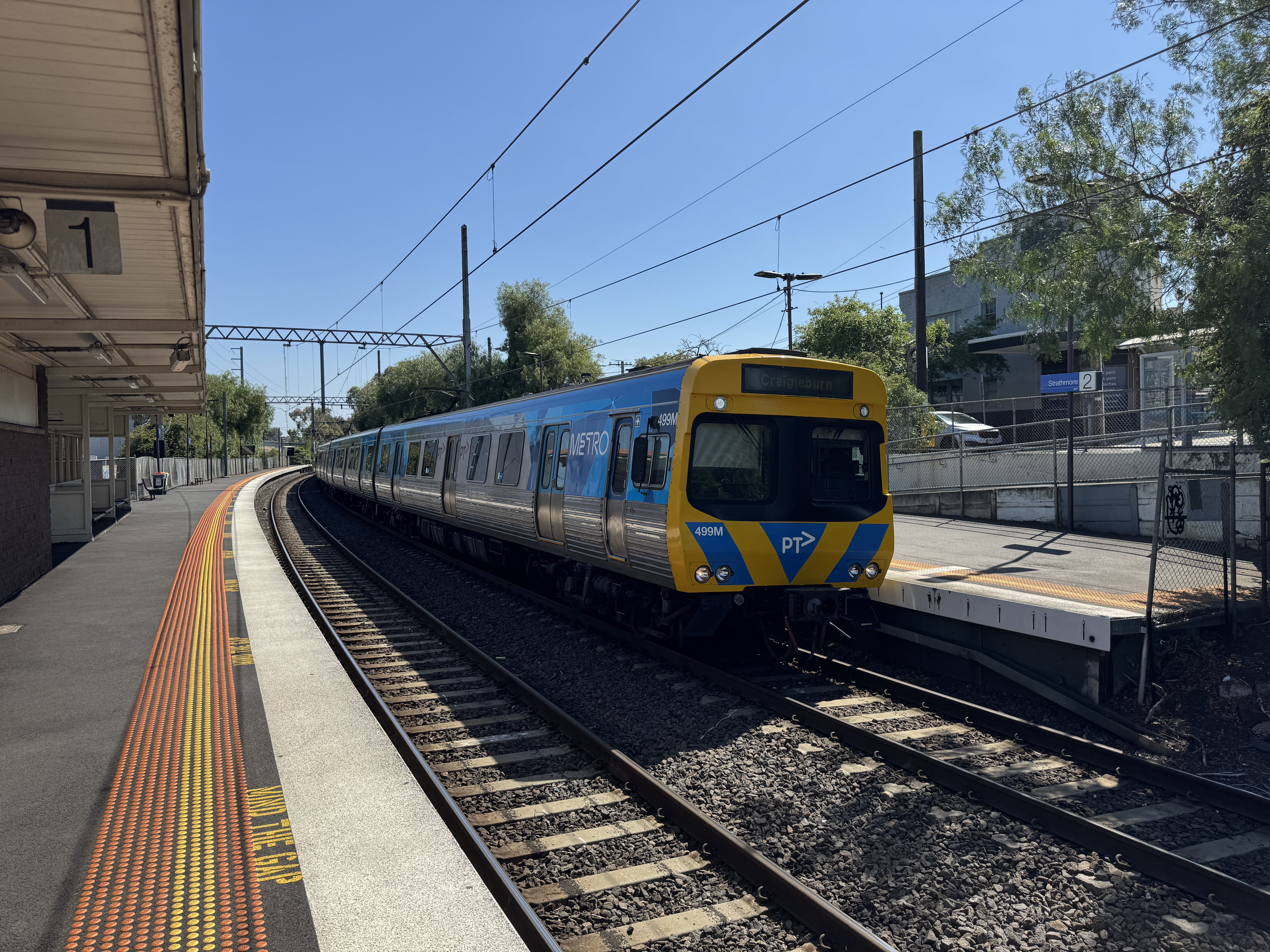
A Comeng train on a Craigieburn-bound service idles at Platform 2, November 2024

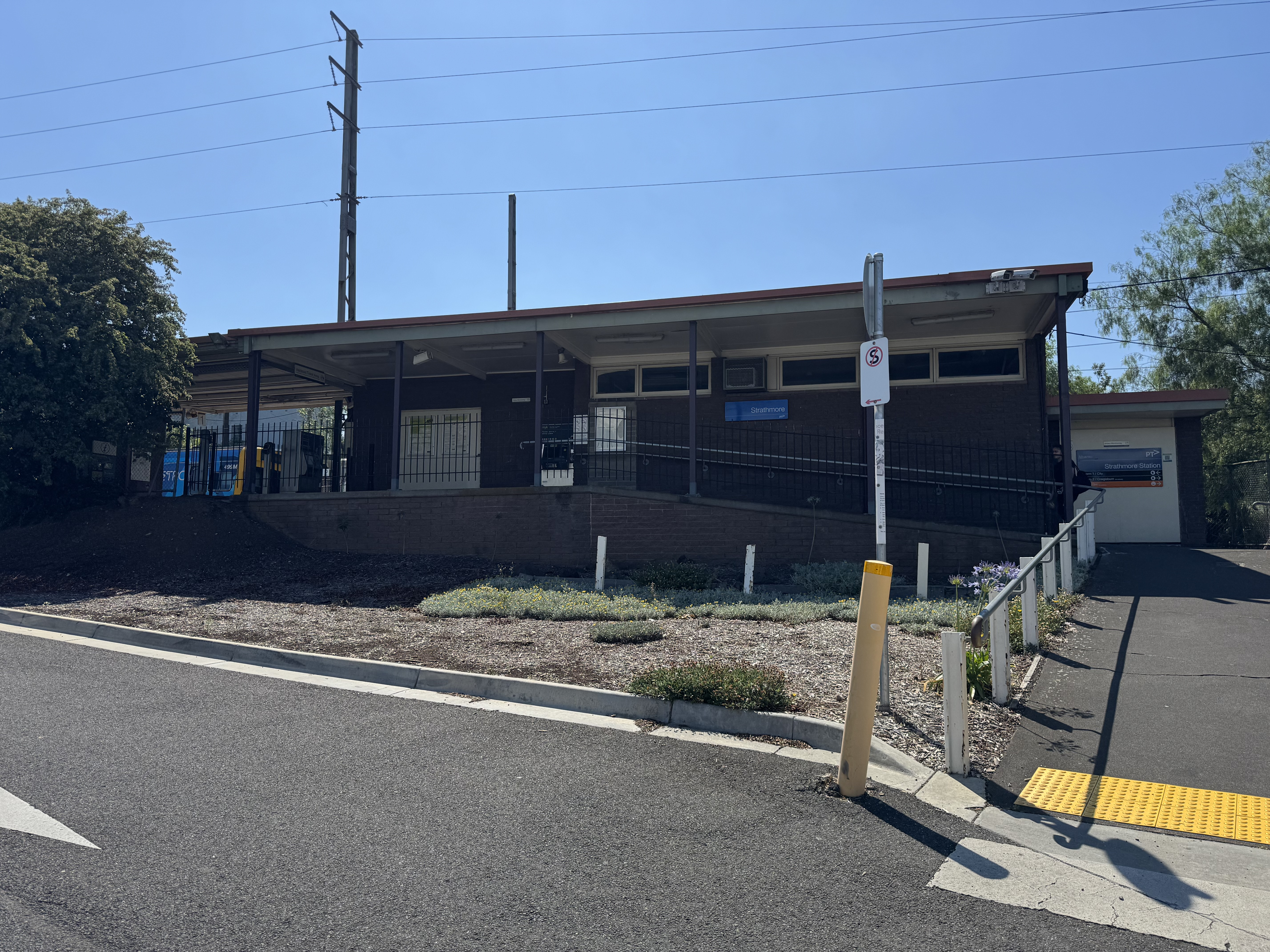
Station building and entrance seen from the station car park, November 2024

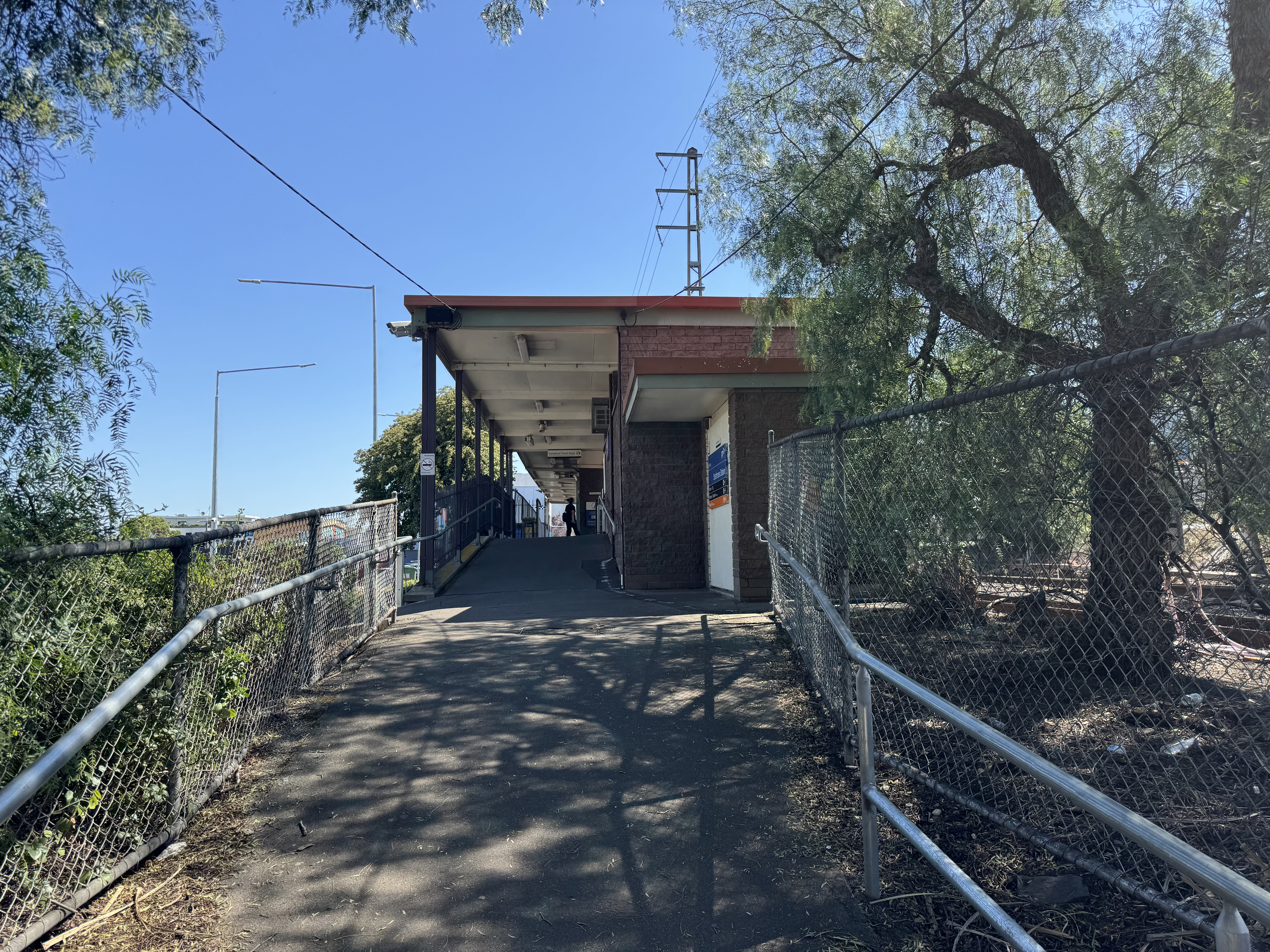
Station building, ramp and entrance to Platform 1, November 2024

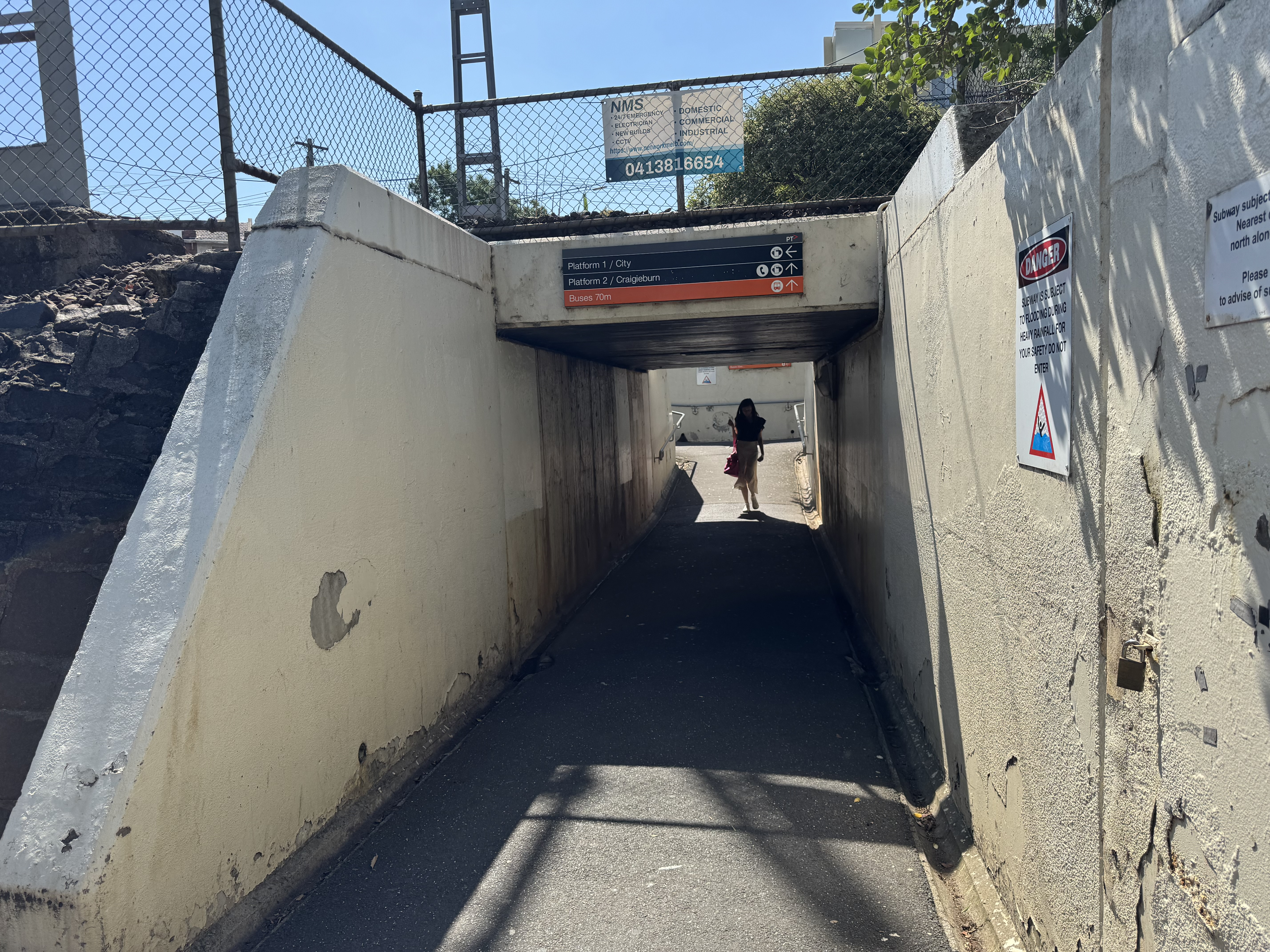
The underpass north of the station and directional signage, November 2024

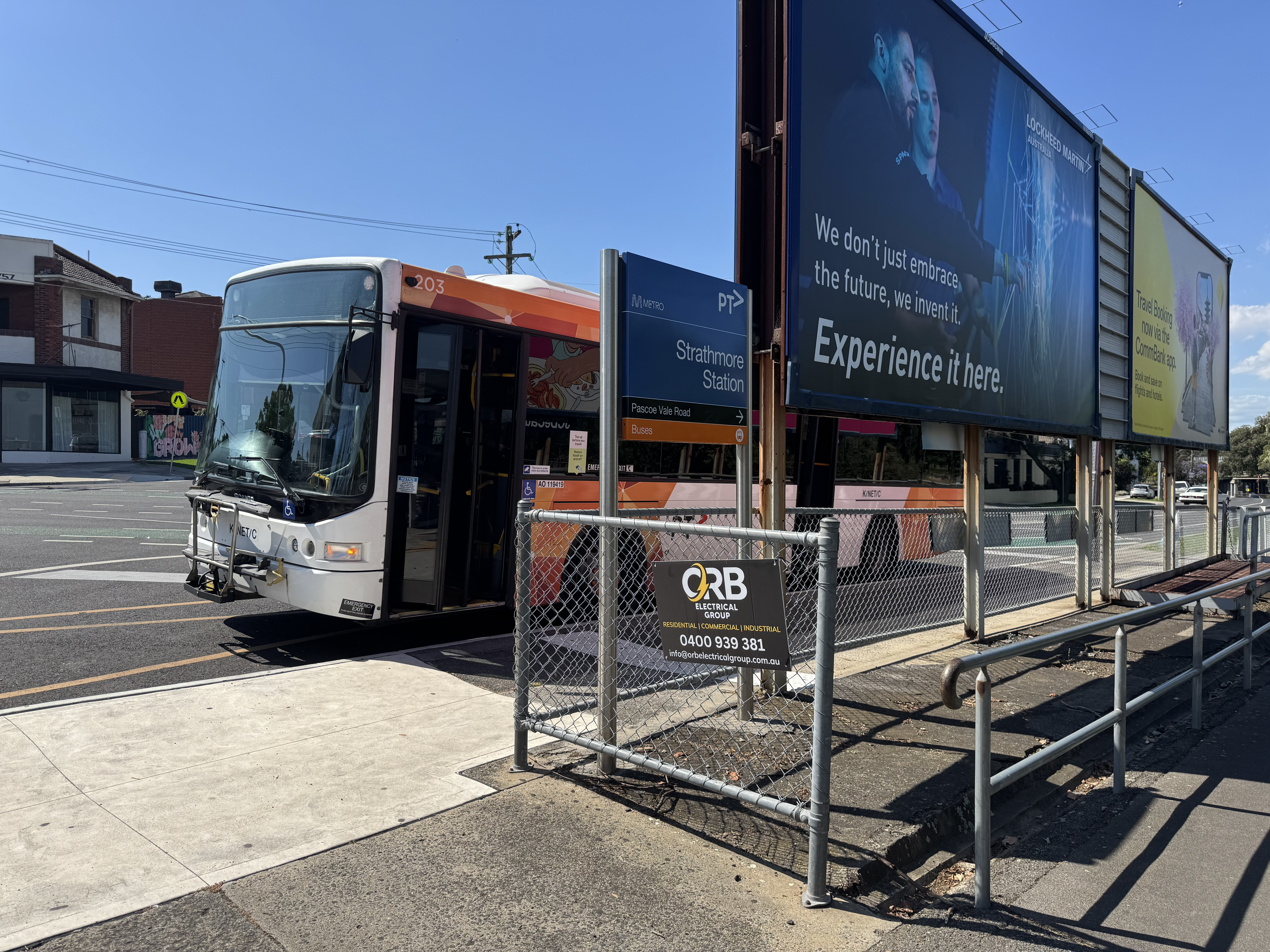
A bus stop outside Platform 2, November 2024

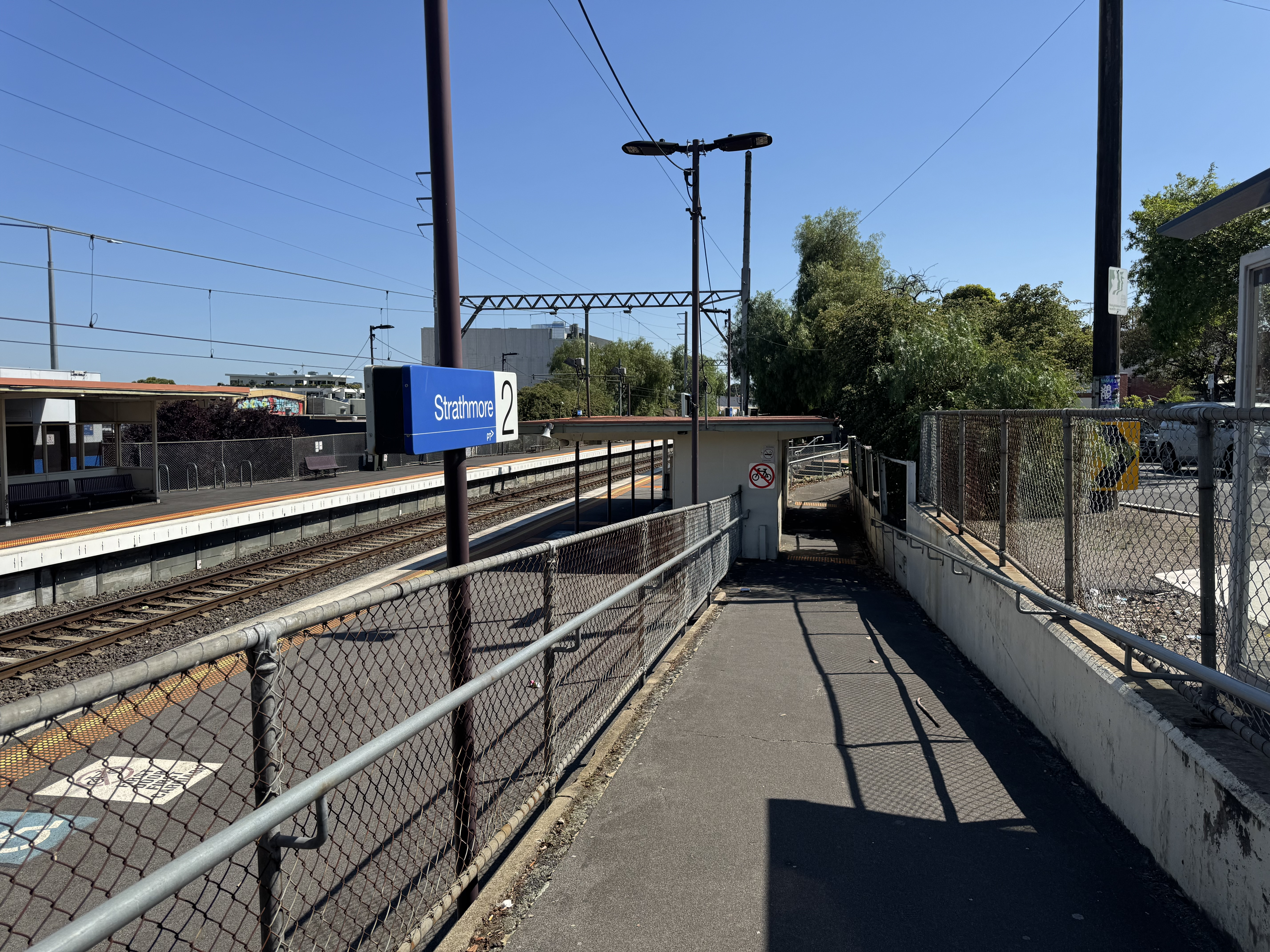
Station ramp and entrance to Platform 2, November 2024

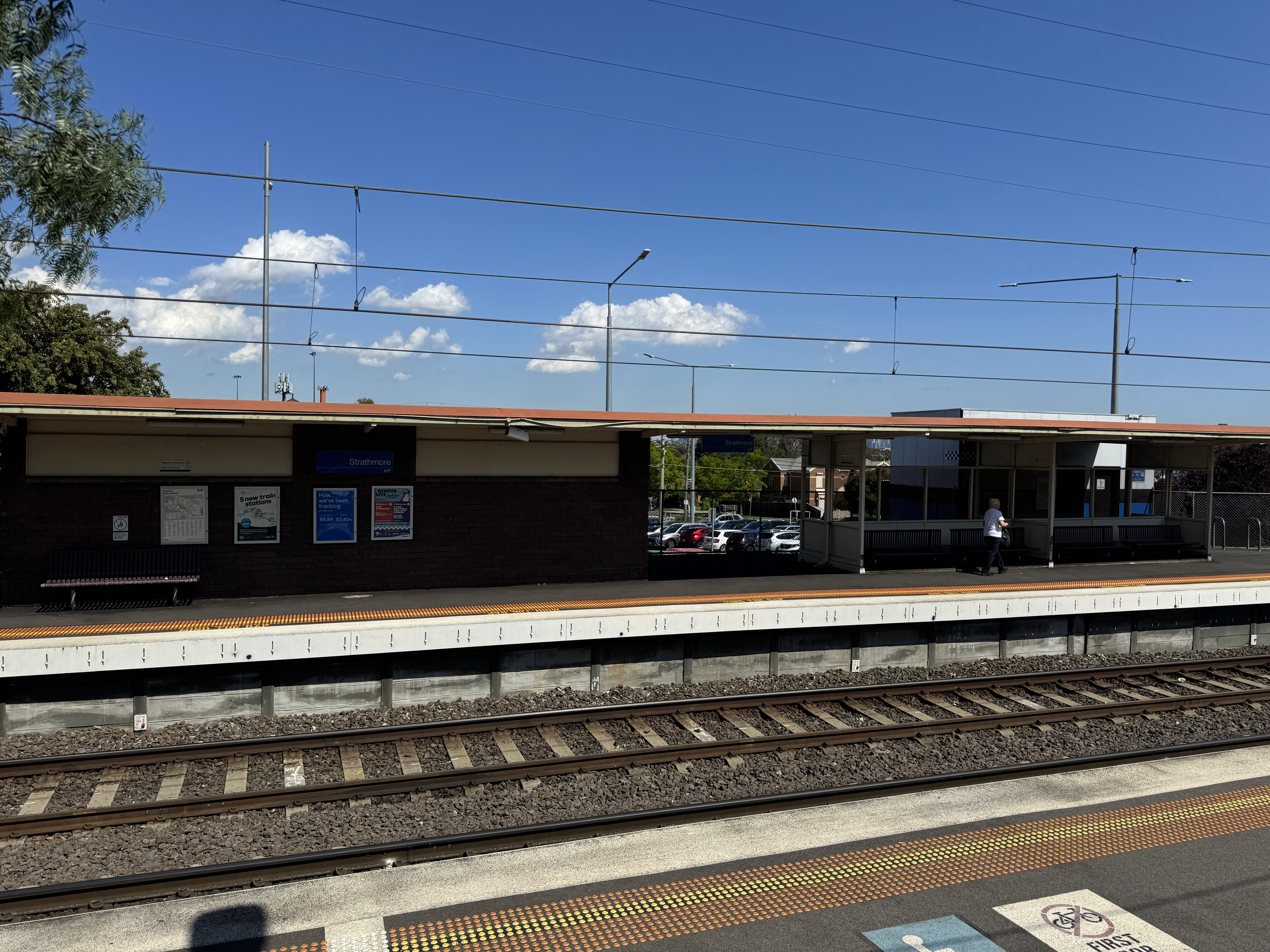
Station building on Platform 1, November 2024
