= Bluestone Cottage Museum =

Heritage-listed house in Melbourne, Victoria, Australia

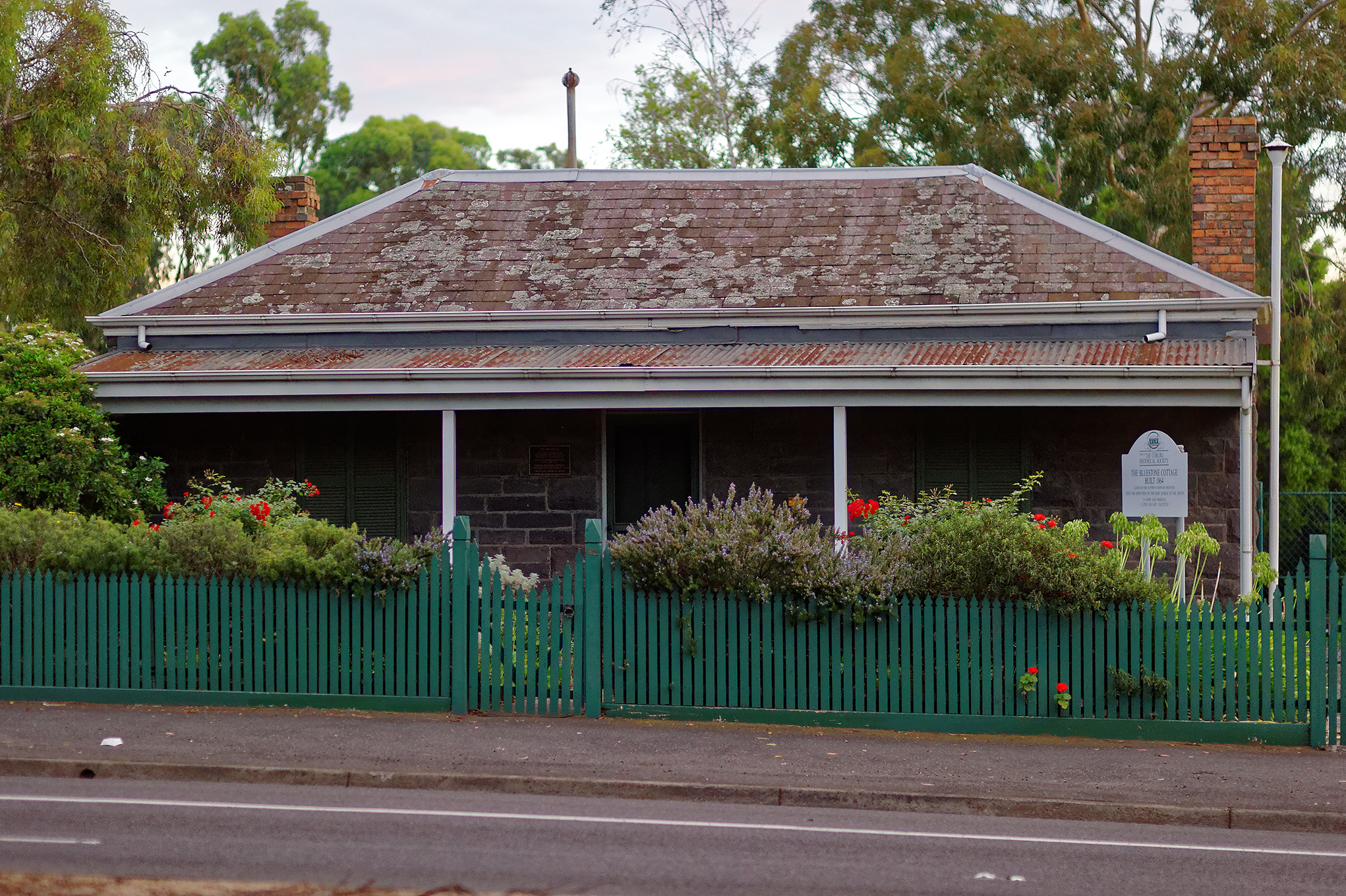
- The cottage in 2020

- Location within Melbourne
- Interactive map of the Bluestone Cottage Museum area

General information
- Status: Completed
- Type: Cottage (1864–1978); History museum (since 1983)
- Location: 82 Bell Street, Coburg, Melbourne, Victoria, Australia
- Coordinates: 37°44′29″S 144°58′14″E
- Current tenants: Coburg Historical Society
- Completed: 1864; 162 years ago
- Client: James Smith
- Owner: James Smith and family (1864–1978); City of Merri-bek (since 1981)

Technical details
- Material: Bluestone; timber; slate; weatherboard

Victorian Heritage Register
- Official name: Cottage, 82 Bell Street
- Type: Registered place
- Designated: 15 June 1988
- Reference no.: H0689
- Heritage overlay no.: HO23
- Categories: Law Enforcement; Residential buildings (private)

Register of the National Estate
- Official name: House, 82 Bell Street
- Type: Defunct register
- Designated: undated
- Reference no.: 14942

The Bluestone Cottage Museum is an historical cottage, now history museum, built using bluestone, located at 82 Bell Street, Coburg, an inner northern suburb of Melbourne, in Victoria, Australia.

Completed in 1864, the cottage was added to the Victorian Heritage Register on 15 June 1988 in recognition of its historical significance. The cottage was also added to non-statutory lists by the Victorian branch of the National Trust on 8 February 1979 and the now defunct Register of the National Estate on an unknown date.

== History ==
This well-preserved double-fronted bluestone cottage was built in 1864 for James Smith, a prison warder, and his wife, Maria. (Note: Sometimes cited be Marion.) The cottage formed part of a group of seven stone and timber cottages in Bell Street owned and occupied by Pentridge Stockade warders.

In the early 1850s, James and Maria Smith arrived at Portland, in the Colony of Victoria, from Ireland with their baby daughter, Mary. The settlement of Coburg was, at that time, called "Pentridge". Smith came to the settlement soon after arrival and found work at the Stockade as a warden and was responsible for the security of the Elm Street gate.

The Smiths lived in a small wooden house on the corner of Rodda and Bell Streets for ten years until it was destroyed by fire. The bluestone house was then constructed a short distance from the original house. The Smith family, traditionally warders and blacksmiths, occupied the house from 1864 until 1978. The land upon which the cottage now stands can be traced to 1865, where the rate book described the property as a stone house and garden on two thousand and twenty-three square metres (zero point five acres). The rate book of 1864 reveals that Smith owned four hectares (nine acres) of grassland around the cottage and it appears that he sold most of this land except for the land upon which the cottage was built.

In 1859 the first bluestone building was completed at HM Prison Pentridge, which had been a prison stockade since 1851. It was only a short time thereafter that 82 Bell Street was constructed and, although it is now situated between the Coburg Children's Centre and a 1950 residence, the cottage remains a fine remnant of the original nucleus of bluestone buildings of Coburg.

== Description ==
This double fronted cottage originally consisted of four rooms, with a separate two-roomed weatherboard building containing a kitchen and laundry was added at the turn of the twentieth century. Constructed from bluestone, it has pine floors and slate roof and a front verandah facing Bell Street. The verandah is very simple and devoid of any decorative detail. The fence and gates appear to be new.

The cottage has historical significance as an illustration of the dominant role of the penal establishment in colonial Victoria, and is remarkable also for its long association from 1864 to 1978 with the Smith family. Perhaps because of this single occupancy, the building has remained remarkably intact.

=== History museum ===
Purchased by the City of Merri-bek in 1981, it has been occupied by the Coburg Historical Society since 1983. The history museum contains permanent displays about the history of Coburg, including commemorations of those who have served in local municipal government since 1859 and those from the local area who served in World Wars I and II, a display of domestic equipment over generations, and a display of photographs and objects from HM Prison Pentridge, including items made by prisoners.

As of May 2026, the cottage and museum were temporarily closed to the public for the remainer of 2026 due to necessary refurbishment.

== See also ==
- Architecture of Melbourne
- List of museums in Melbourne
- List of places on the Victorian Heritage Register in the City of Merri-bek
