= Coburg, Victoria =

Suburb of Melbourne, Victoria, Australia

Coburg
- Suburb
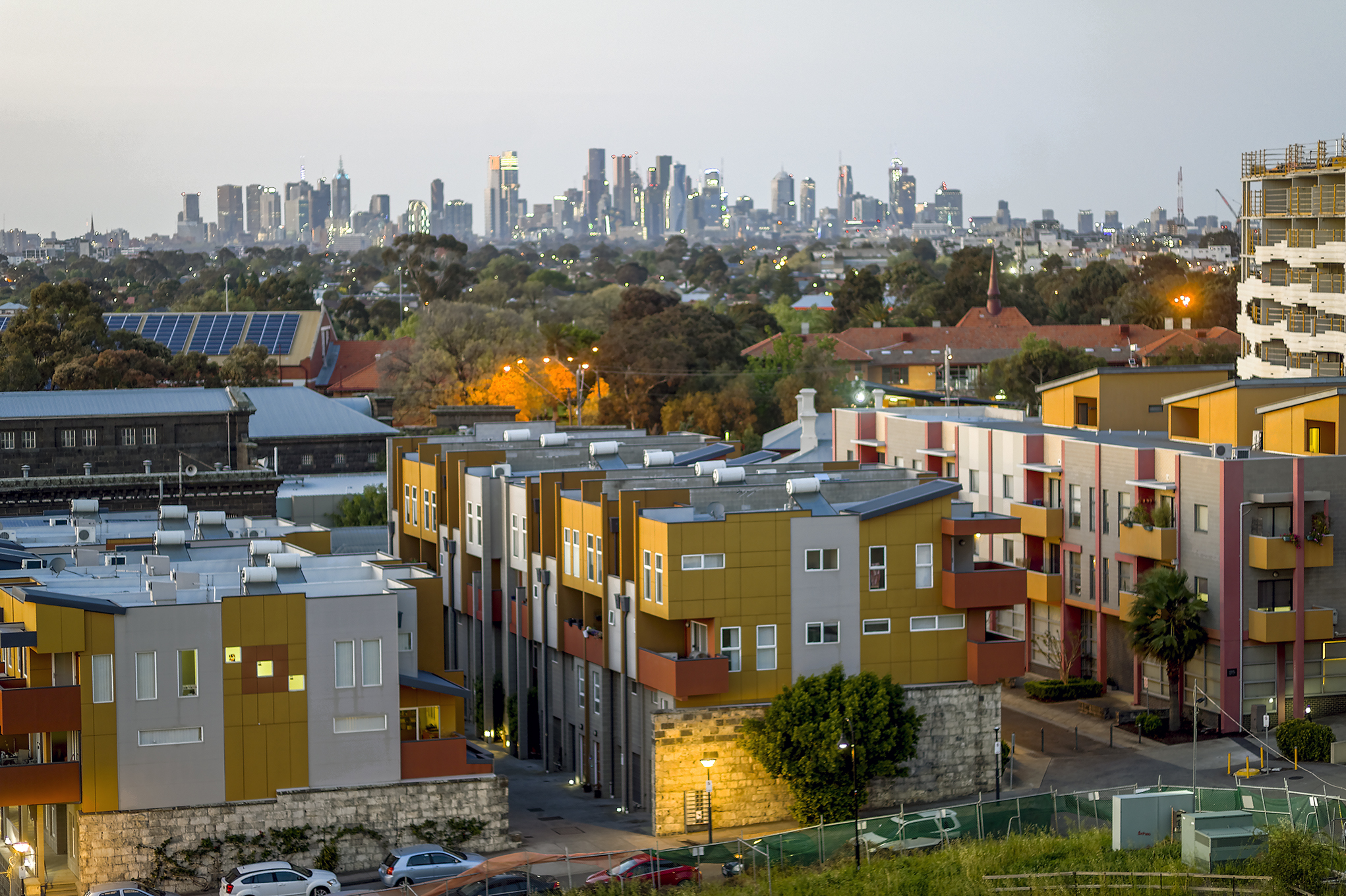
- View of Coburg and the apartments on Pentridge Boulevard, looking towards Melbourne CBD, 2020

- Interactive map of Coburg
- Coordinates: 37.7438°S 144.9645°E
- Country: Australia
- State: Victoria
- City: Melbourne
- LGAs: City of Darebin; City of Merri-bek
- Location: 8 km (5.0 mi) N of Melbourne

Government
  - State electorates: Pascoe Vale; Preston
  - Federal divisions: Cooper; Wills

Area
  - Total: 7 km^{2} (2.7 sq mi)
- Elevation: 63 m (207 ft)

Population
  - Total: 26,574 (2021 census)
  - Density: 3,800/km^{2} (9,800/sq mi)
- Postcode: 3058
Suburbs around Coburg
Coburg North; Pascoe Vale	Coburg North	Preston
Pascoe Vale South	Coburg	Preston
Brunswick West	Brunswick	Brunswick East; Thornbury

Coburg is an inner-northern suburb of Melbourne, in Victoria, Australia, 8 km (5.0 mi) north of the Melbourne central business district. It is mainly a part of the City of Merri-bek local government area, with a handful of properties on its eastern boundary in the City of Darebin. The population of Coburg at the 2021 census was 26,574.

Known for its large Lebanese, Greek and Italian populations, Coburg is famously culturally diverse, with its primary shopping stretch, Sydney Rd, being known across Melbourne for its variety of storefronts, ranging from the suburb's specialty; kebab shops, cafés, Greek and Italian style patisseries, to grocery stores and delis of different cultures.

Since European settlement, the area became known as Pentridge (named after Pentridge, Dorset), Coburg was surveyed by Robert Hoddle in 1837–1838 and a 132-hectare (327-acre) reservation for a village was established, served by two district roads: Bell St West and what would be called Sydney Road. In an effort by the council to separate the broader area's reputation from the already infamous HM Prison Pentridge, the area became known as Coburg in 1870, and was later formally proclaimed as the Shire of Coburg in 1874.

Coburg's boundaries are Gaffney Street and Murray Road in the north, Elizabeth Street and Merri Creek in the east, Moreland Road in the South and Melville Road, Devon Avenue, Sussex Street and West Street in the west. Coburg is designated one of 26 Principal Activity Centres in the Melbourne 2030 Metropolitan Strategy.

== History ==
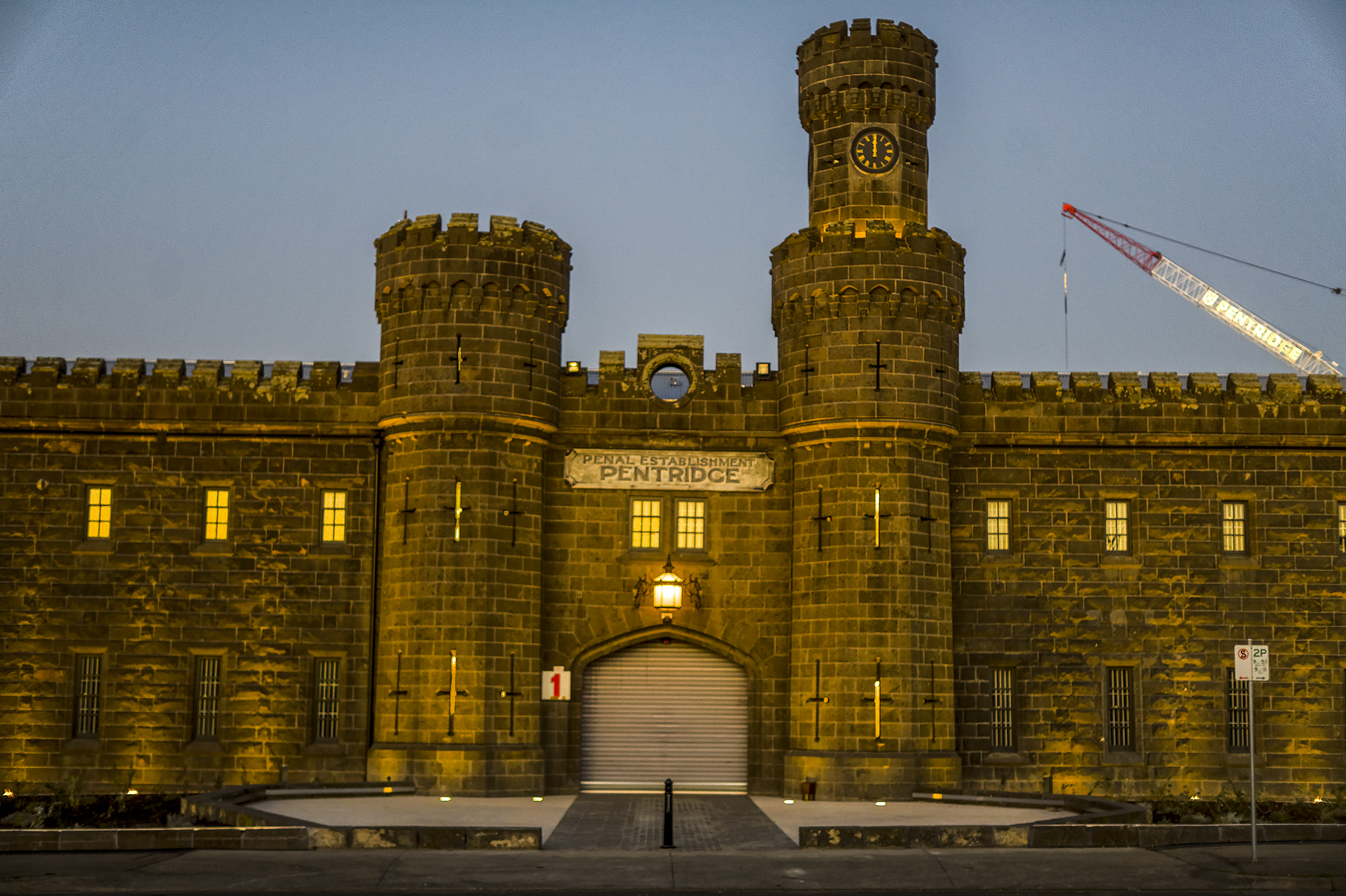
Entrance to the former HM Prison Pentridge, 2020

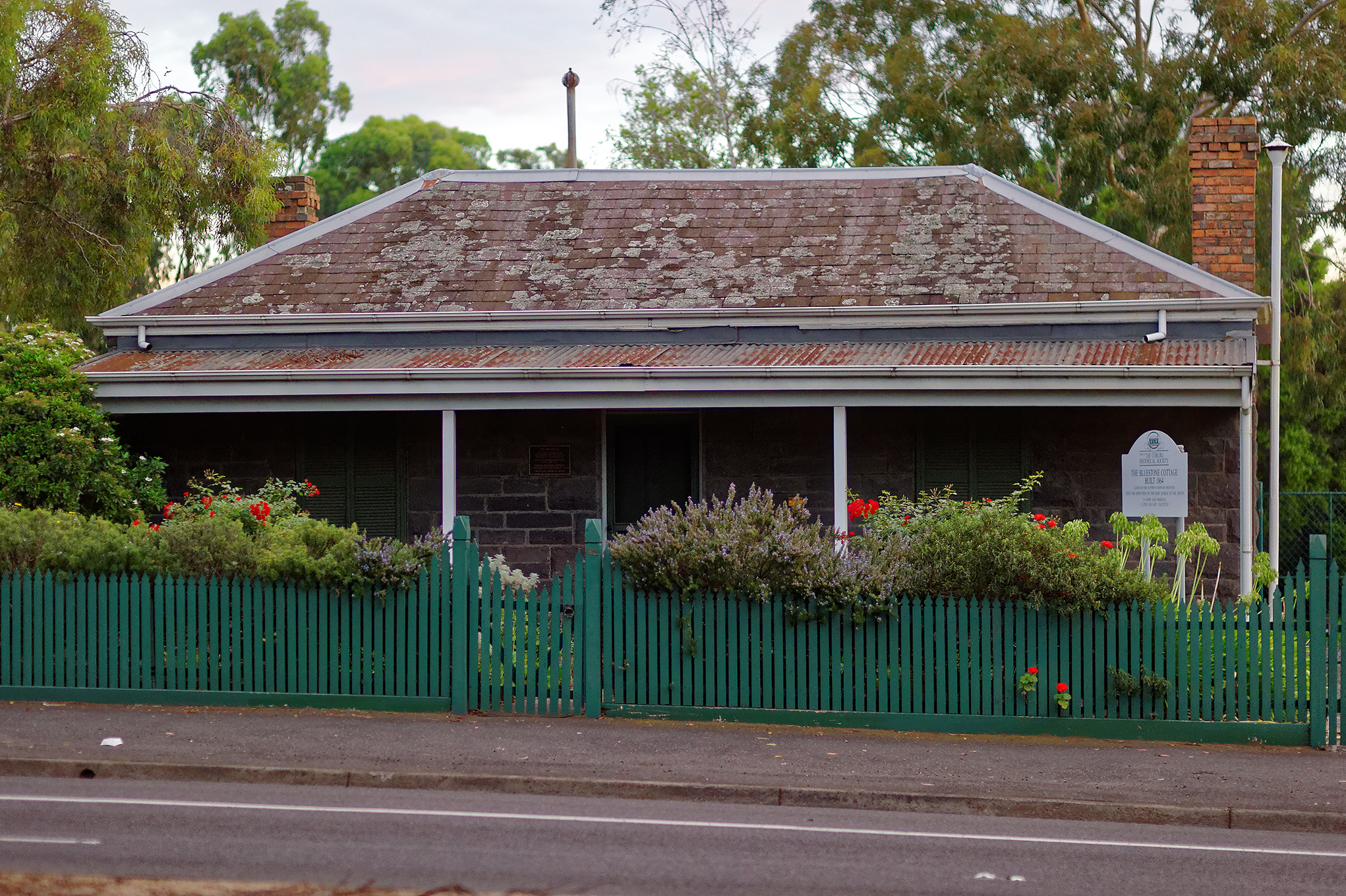
Bluestone cottage, now museum, built 1864

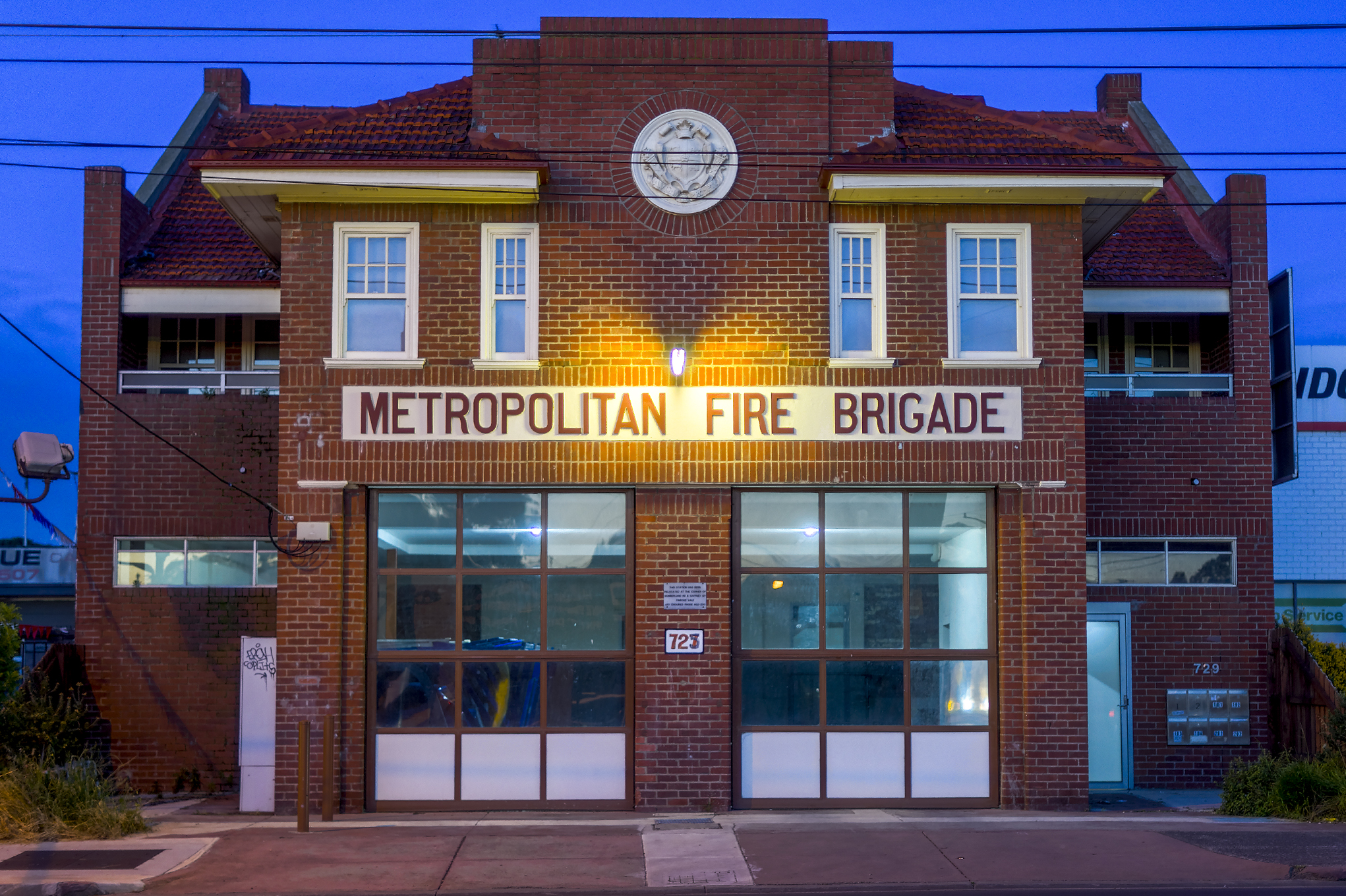
Coburg Metropolitan Fire Brigade Station, used from 1925 to 1992

Prior to European settlement, the area around Coburg and Merri Creek was occupied by the Woiwurrung-speaking Wurundjeri people of the Kulin Nation. The Wurundjeri had a religious relationship to their land, participating in corroborees and sacred ceremonies on Merri Creek.

Coburg was first surveyed by Robert Hoddle in 1837–1838, and he recorded that a Mr Hyatt had a sheep station and hut on the east bank of the Merri Creek, near present Outlook Road. Hoddle marked out a 327-acre (1.32 km^{2}) village reserve with two roads for the district: Bell Street West and Pentridge Road, later called Sydney Road. In 1840, the village was named Pentridge by a surveyor called Henry Foot, who lived and worked near Merri Creek. It was named after the birthplace of Foot's wife: Pentridge, Dorset, England.

Dr Farquhar McCrae, a wealthy surgeon, purchased 243 hectares (600 acres) in the area which he called Moreland. In 1841, he also bought land called "La Rose" in what is now known as Pascoe Vale South. The house he built in 1842 or 1843 is now known as Wentworth House, and is the oldest known private dwelling in Victoria still standing on its original site and the fifth oldest building in Victoria.

In 1842, the first inn, The Golden Fleece, was built on Sydney Road just north of Page Street. Twenty one farms were in the area by 1849. With the Victorian gold rush in the 1850s, the population of the area grew rapidly. In 1858, water mains from the Yan Yean Reservoir were connected and the first local paper, the Brunswick and Pentridge Press, was started. In 1859, the Pentridge District Road Board was formed to get roads built in the area, which was the first local government that governed the area.

In the 1850s, quarrying of bluestone began in the area, and by 1875, there were 41 quarries in Coburg. In December 1850, 16 prisoners were moved from an overcrowded Melbourne Gaol to a stockade at Pentridge. Prisoners, at what came to be called HM Prison Pentridge, were immediately put on "hard labour" by breaking up bluestone for road surfaces. In 1867, a public meeting was called to change the name of the district, as residents were stigmatised and embarrassed at living in a suburb principally known for its jail, Pentridge Prison. Robert Mailer of Glencairn suggested that the suburb name be changed to Coburg, inspired by the impending visit to the colony of the Duke of Edinburgh, who was a member of the royal house of Saxe-Coburg and Gotha. The government agreed with the proposal and the change was made in March 1870.

The post office opened on 1 August 1853, and the district was renamed Coburg in January 1870.

Sydney Road attracted numerous hotels and commercial premises in the 1860s. Friendly societies soon formed: Manchester Unity (1863), Druids (1867), Rechabites (1868) and a St. Patrick's Society in (1870). Coburg later became a Shire in 1875.

The Upfield railway line opened in 1884, and the Coburg railway station was built in 1888. In February 1889, the horse tram service began along Sydney Road. Electric trams started in service in 1916.

By 1899, there were 6000 people in the district. Coburg was gazetted as a borough in 1905, with Thomas Greenwood becoming Coburg's first mayor. The Public Hall, built in 1869, was extended in 1909, but was still inadequate for the growing city. The new Town Hall was built and opened in 1923, with further extensions in 1928.

Coburg Lake Reserve is a popular picnic spot on the Merri Creek. The land was purchased in 1912 and a weir was constructed in 1915 to form a lake contained by basaltic outcroppings. The reserve was immensely popular, with diving boards, wading pools, kiosks and gardens, also accessed by the Merri Creek Trail.

After World War I, there was significant development east of Sydney Road, with the former East Coburg Primary School opening in 1926, and a Coburg East Post Office opening in 1929 (closing in 1975).

A Coburg West Post Office opened in 1936 and closed in 1979.

The Coburg Magistrates' Court closed on 1 February 1985.

Coburg High School originally opened in 1911 on Bell Street as the Coburg Higher Elementary School in Coburg Primary School, before moving to a new building which opened on 1 January 1916 across the road. On 31 December 1993, Coburg High School closed and was subsequently merged with the Preston Secondary College on 1 January 1994 to become the Coburg Preston Secondary College, located on the same site as the 1916 building. The new college closed on 31 December 1996 and merged with the Coburg East Primary School to form the Moreland City College on 1 January 1997, located at a new site where it closed on 31 December 2004. In 2005, a fire destroyed the disused and dilapidated original Coburg High School building, sometime after which it was demolished. In 2007, Coburg Senior Secondary College opened, catering for years 10 to 12. The school was renamed Coburg High School in 2015 and started accommodating years 7 to 12.

In 1994, the City of Coburg was merged with the City of Brunswick to become the City of Moreland (renamed the City of Merri-bek on 26 September 2022).

== Population ==
Historical population
Year	Pop.	±%
2001	22,446	—
2006	23,722	+5.7%
2011	24,977	+5.3%
2016	26,185	+4.8%
2021	26,574	+1.5%

In the 2021 census, there were 26,574 people in Coburg, an increase of 1.5% from the 2016 census.

67.1% of people were born in Australia. The next most common countries of birth were Italy 4.4%, Greece 2.6%, England 2.3%, Lebanon 2.2% and Nepal 1.9%. 65.3% of people spoke only English at home. Other languages spoken at home included Italian 6.8%, Greek 5.5%, Arabic 5.3%, Mandarin 2.0% and Nepali 1.9%.

The most common responses for religion in Coburg were No Religion 46.8%, Catholic 22.6% and Eastern Orthodox 8.1%.

== Culture ==
The cultural diversity of Coburg is reflected through its street and music festivals, as well as its diverse range of cafés, bakeries, restaurants, and grocery shops offering ingredients from around the world. This diversity is particularly evident along the Coburg stretch of Sydney Road, the suburb's main shopping street, where more than a dozen kebab shops operated as of 2021. In the same year, Melbourne newspaper the Herald-Sun conducted a reader poll asking which suburb best represented kebab culture, with Coburg being voted the winner. Because of this, the area is sometimes colloquially referred to as "Kebaburg".

== Commerce ==
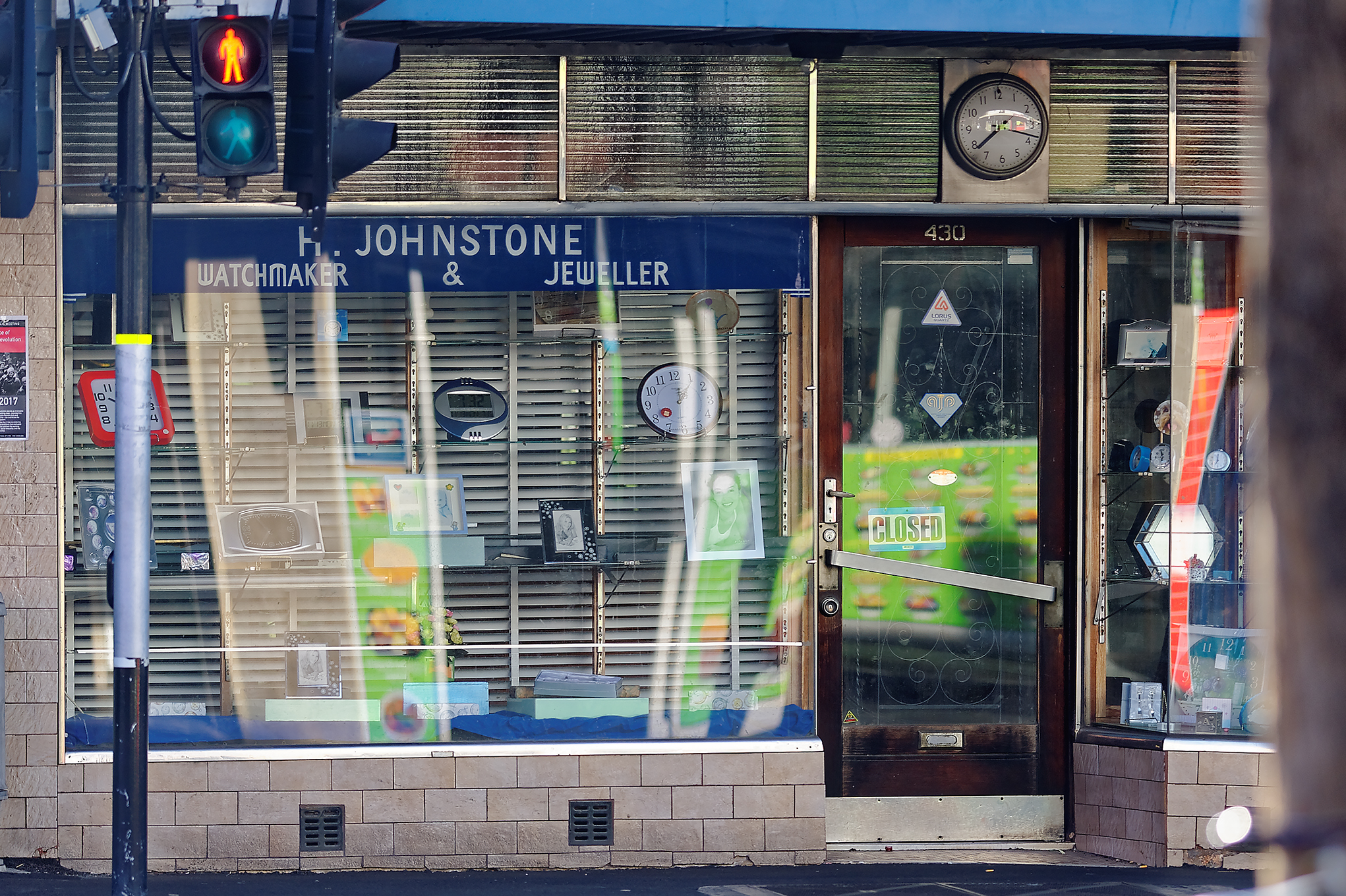
Sydney Road Jeweller, 2017

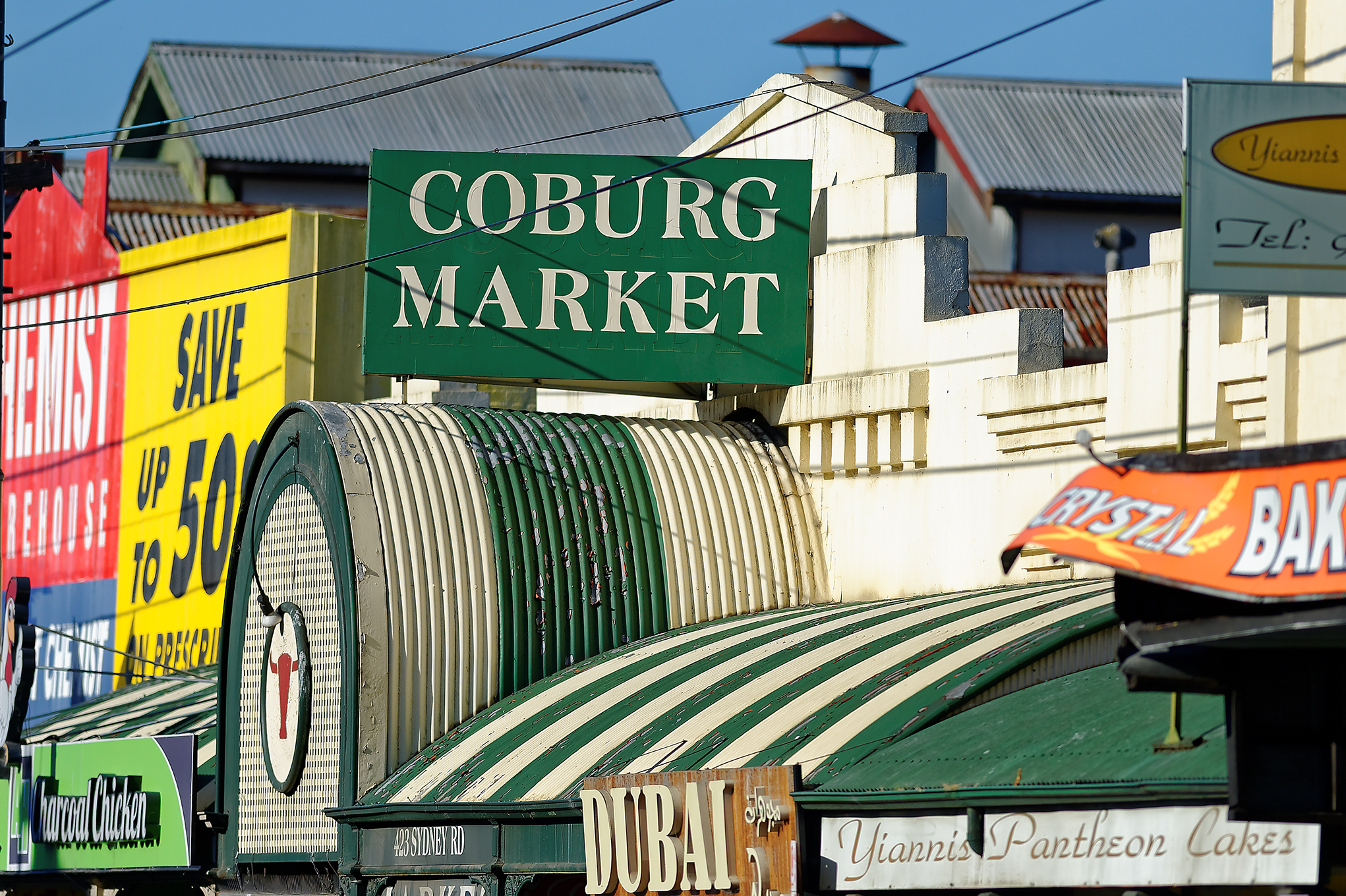
Coburg Market façade, 2018

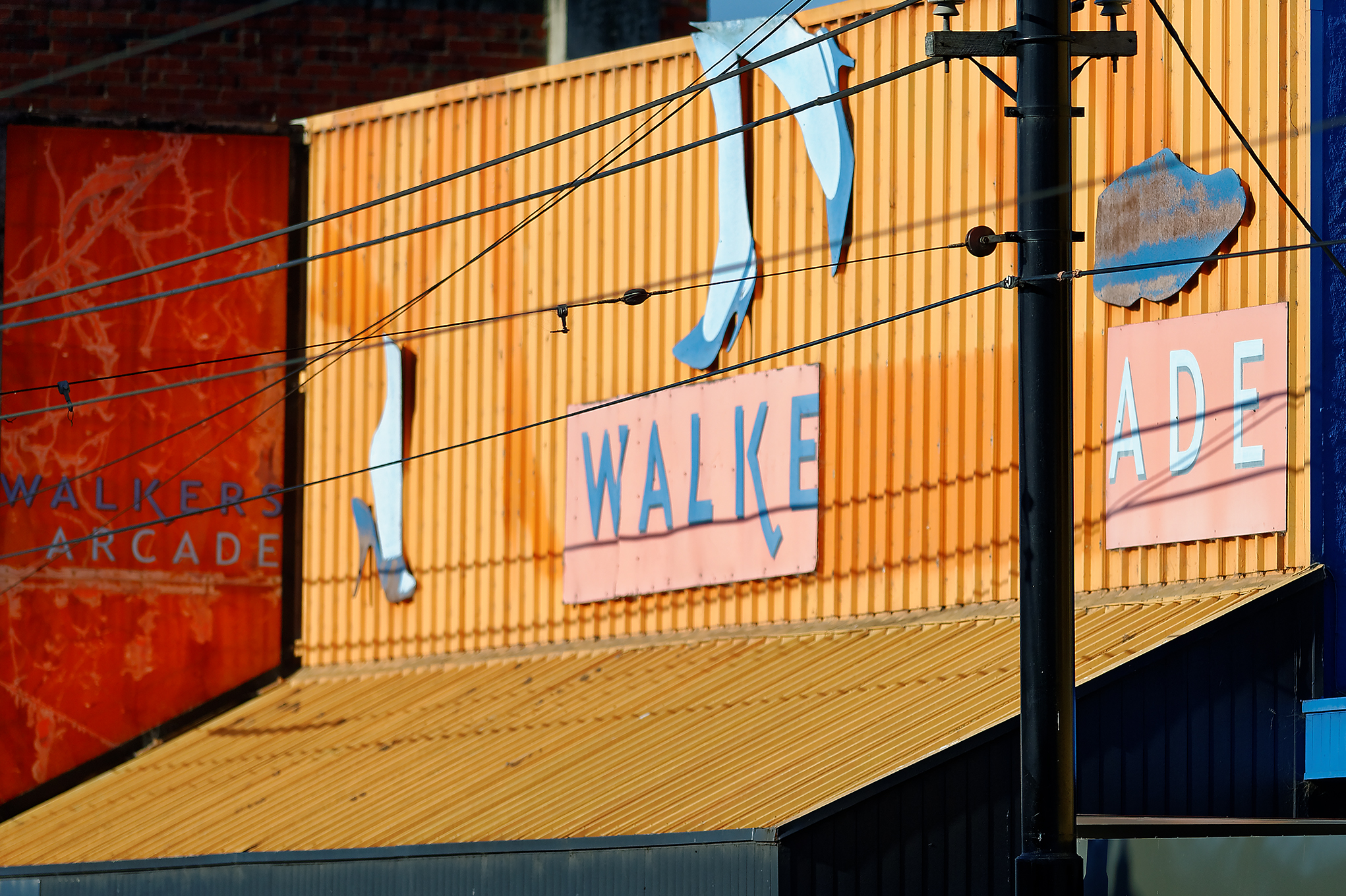
Walkers Arcade Façade, 2018

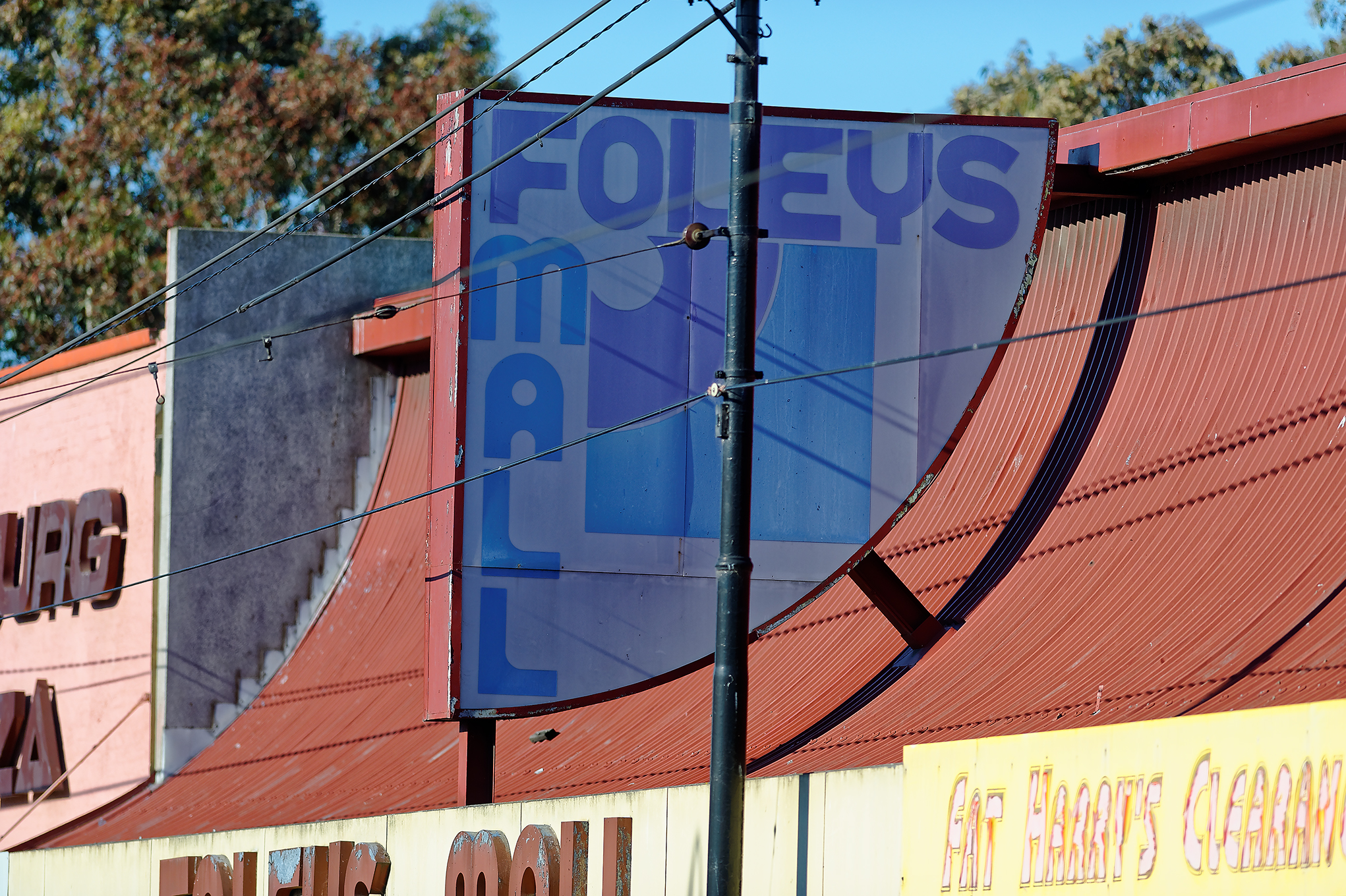
Foleys Mall façade, 2018

The main commercial activity in Coburg is the precinct between Coburg railway station and Sydney Road. Coburg has a small shopping mall at the redeveloped Pentridge Prison precinct and four shopping arcades on the west side of Sydney Road. Coburg's main commercial precinct comprises about 250 shops, a small indoor market, several supermarkets such as Coles and Woolworths and discount stores such as Dimmeys, arranged around large, ground level car parks. In the 1990s, the Victoria Street pedestrian mall was revamped with native trees and bluestone paving and has become an extremely popular place for locals to congregate, enjoying the local cafes. While Coburg Shopping Centre is very busy during the day, its modest number of restaurants, cafes and bars means that it can be quiet in the evenings. The commercial strip of Sydney Road is continuous from Coburg's southern neighbour Brunswick, but it has a very different character, having so far remained somewhat ungentrified.

== Transport ==
=== Bus ===
Ten bus routes service Coburg:

- 510 : Essendon station – Ivanhoe station via Brunswick, Northcote and Thornbury, operated by Kinetic Melbourne
- 512 : Strathmore station – East Coburg via Pascoe Vale South, Coburg West and Coburg, operated by Kinetic Melbourne
- 513 : Eltham station – Glenroy station via Lower Plenty, operated by Kinetic Melbourne
- 514 : Eltham station – Glenroy station via Greensborough, operated by Kinetic Melbourne
- 526 : Coburg – Reservoir via Elizabeth Street, perated by Ventura Bus Lines
- 527 : Gowrie station – Northland Shopping Centre via Murray Road, perated by Ventura Bus Lines
- 530 : Campbellfield Plaza Shopping Centre – Coburg via Fawkner, operated by CDC Melbourne
- 534 : Glenroy station – Coburg via Boundary Road and Sydney Road, perated by Dysons
- 561 : Macleod – Pascoe Vale station via La Trobe University, operated by Dysons
- SmartBus 903 : Altona station – Mordialloc, operated by Kinetic Melbourne

=== Cycling ===
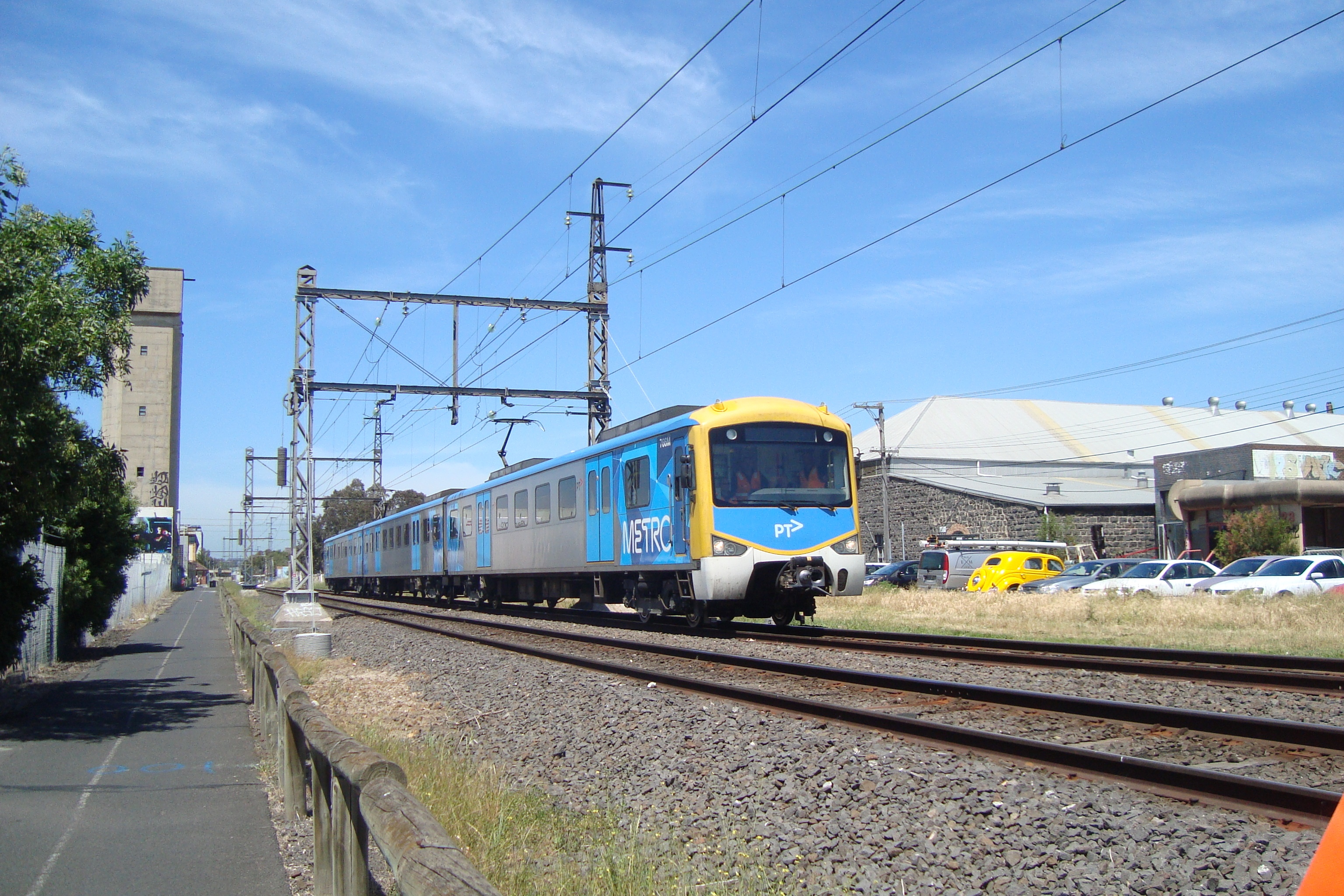
Upfield Bike Path which is located along Brunswick, Coburg and Coburg North along the Upfield railway line, taken near Tinning Street, Brunswick

Cyclists have access to many on-road bike lanes as well as the Upfield Bike Path and the Merri Creek Trail.

=== Train ===
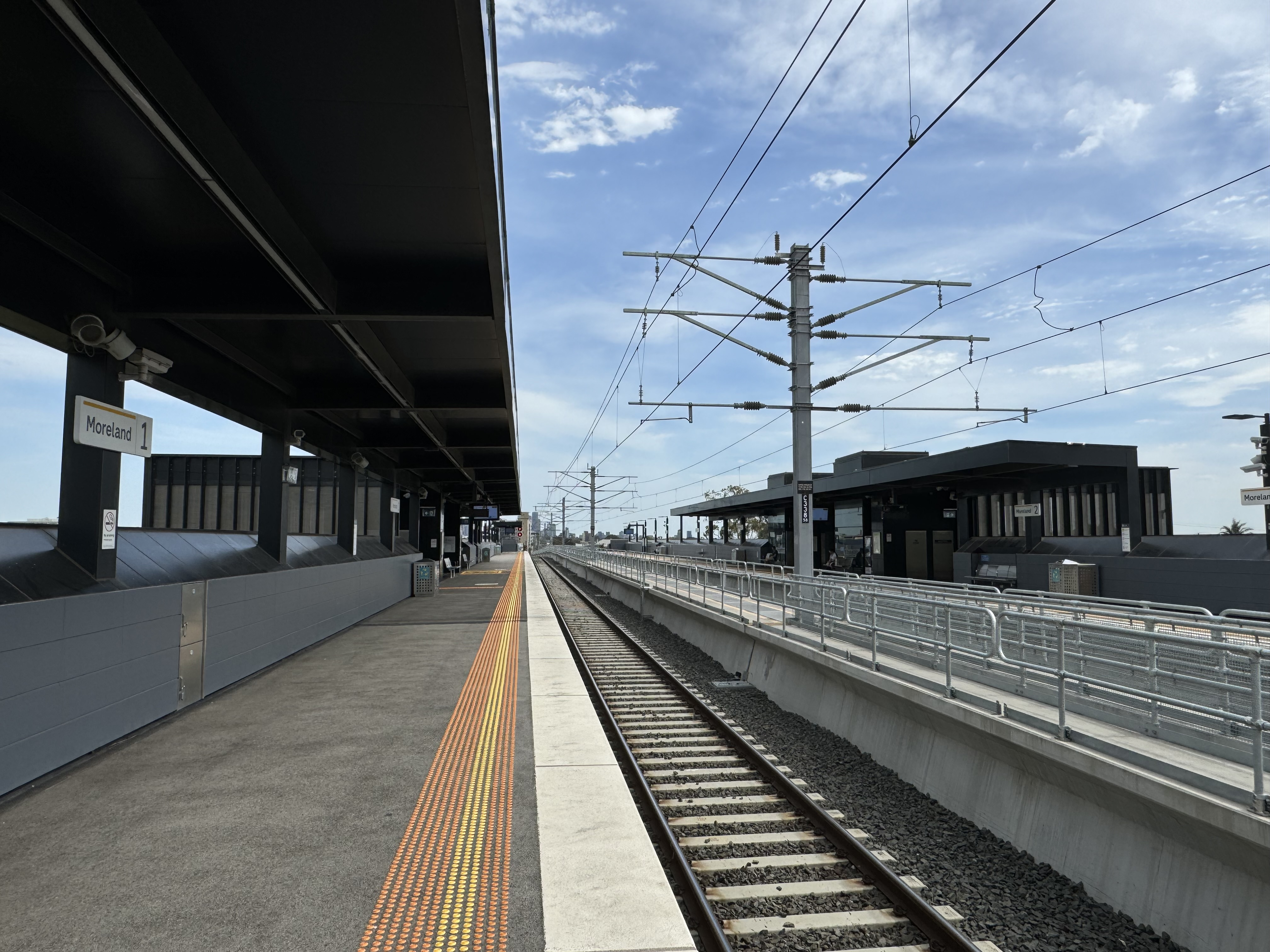
Moreland railway station on the Upfield line, viewing southbound from Platform 1, November 2024

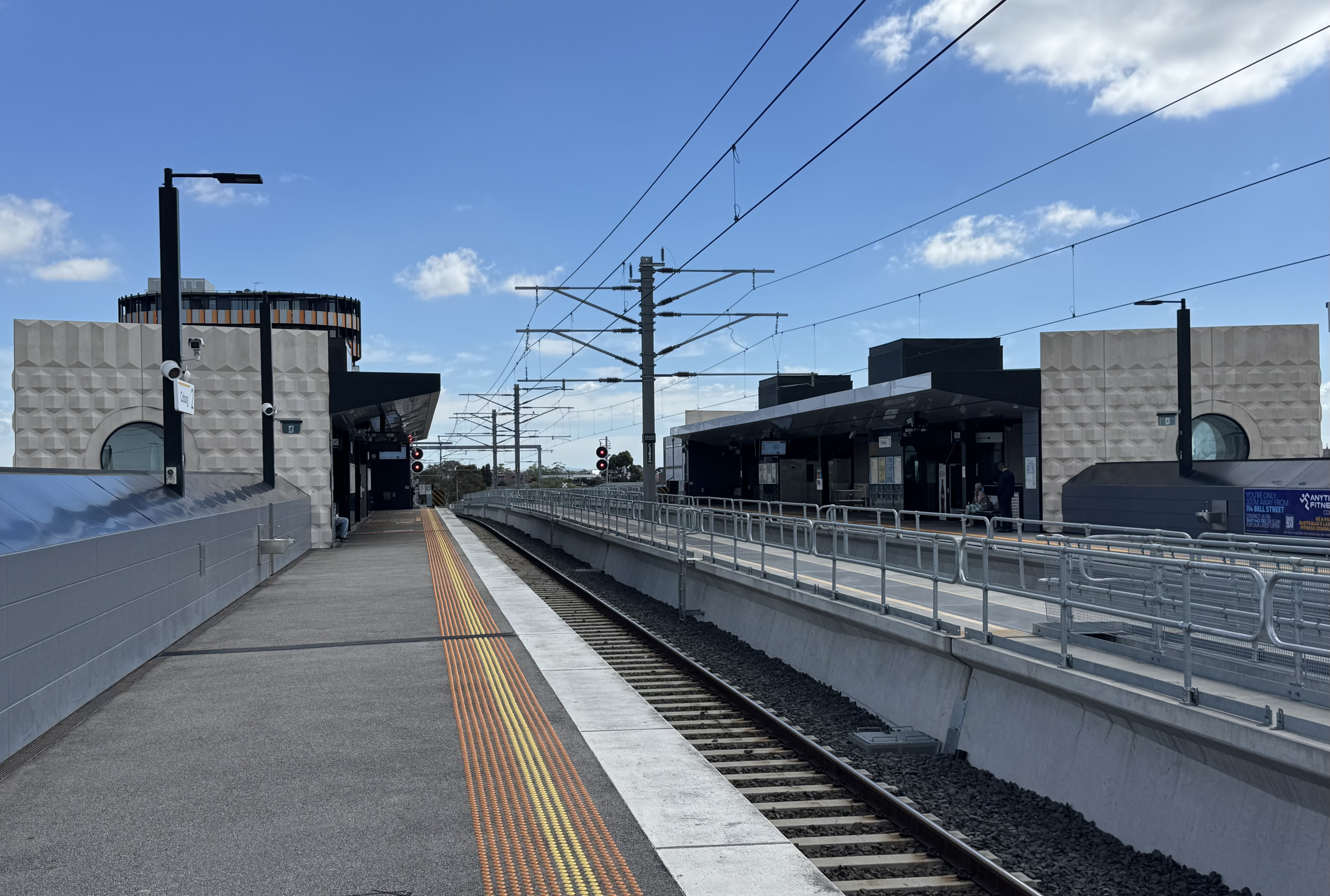
Coburg railway station on the Upfield line, viewing northbound from Platform 2, November 2025

The stations of Moreland and Coburg service the south of Coburg, while Batman and Merlynston service Coburg North. These stations are all located on the Upfield railway line.

=== Tram ===
Three tram lines service Coburg:

- travels along Sydney Road from the terminus at Bakers Road, Coburg North to Flinders Street station in the city. While the scheduled service is 6–15 minutes apart, it is frequently late due traffic congestion on Sydney Road.
- travels from the terminus at Bell Street, Coburg, along Nicholson Street, then Lygon Street Brunswick East, Swanston Street past Flinders Street station to South Melbourne Beach.
- travels from the tram depot on Moreland Road, joining the number 1 route at the intersection of Moreland Road and Nicholson Street. While the number 1 turns to South Melbourne at the Arts Centre, route 6 continues along St Kilda Road to Glen Iris.
- from Toorak serves the western part of Coburg via Melville Road, terminating at Bell Street.

== Educational facilities ==
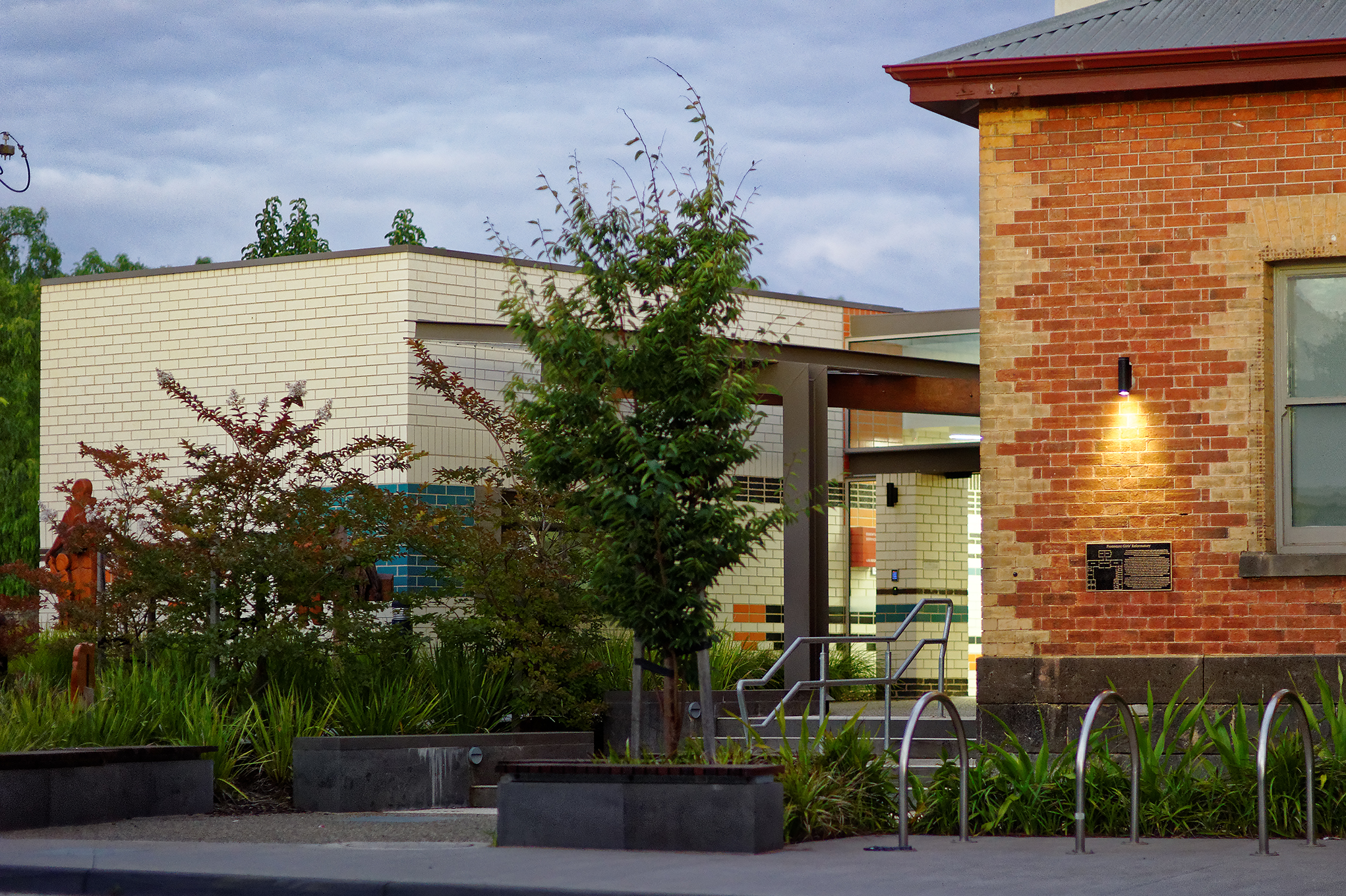
Maternal and Child Health Centre, in the Pentridge precinct

Coburg has a variety of primary and secondary educational facilities. These include four government primary schools (Coburg Primary, Coburg North Primary, Coburg West Primary, and Merri-bek Primary), three Catholic primary schools (St Bernard's, St Paul's, and the junior campus of a Maronite Catholic school, Antonine College). The government high school is Coburg High School, which was re-established in 2015 following a sustained local campaign. Neighbouring this is the Coburg campus of Bindjiroo Yaluk Community School (BYCS), previously known as Lynall Hall Community School, a small, progressive government school which offers the VCE-VM as well as VET. There is one Catholic High School, Mercy College for girls. In 2024, Coburg Special Development School, a school for students with a moderate to profound intellectual disability, as well as sensory and physical impairments and autism spectrum disorder, relocated to purpose-built premises next door to Coburg High School and Bindjiroo Yaluk Community School.

== Sport ==
The suburb is home to the Coburg Lions Australian rules football club in the Victorian Football League; the suburb also is home to two Essendon District Football League clubs – West Coburg FC and Northern Saints FC. Coburg also has basketball, cricket, tennis, baseball, swimming, table tennis, track cycling and soccer clubs. One of the oldest sporting clubs in the area is the Coburg Harriers Athletic Club, which has been established for over 100 years.

== Landmarks and notable places ==
Coburg

Major features of the area include the Sydney Road commercial area, the Merri-bek City Council civic centre precinct on Bell Street including the Coburg City Hall, La Rose house (Victoria's oldest known private dwelling), the John Fawkner Hospital on Moreland Road, and Lake Reserve on Merri Creek. The suburb's most famous landmark is the former HM Prison Pentridge, which, since 2013, was redeveloped into a housing estate. Land prices have risen considerably since 2001, with The Grove long regarded the most prestigious street in the suburb.

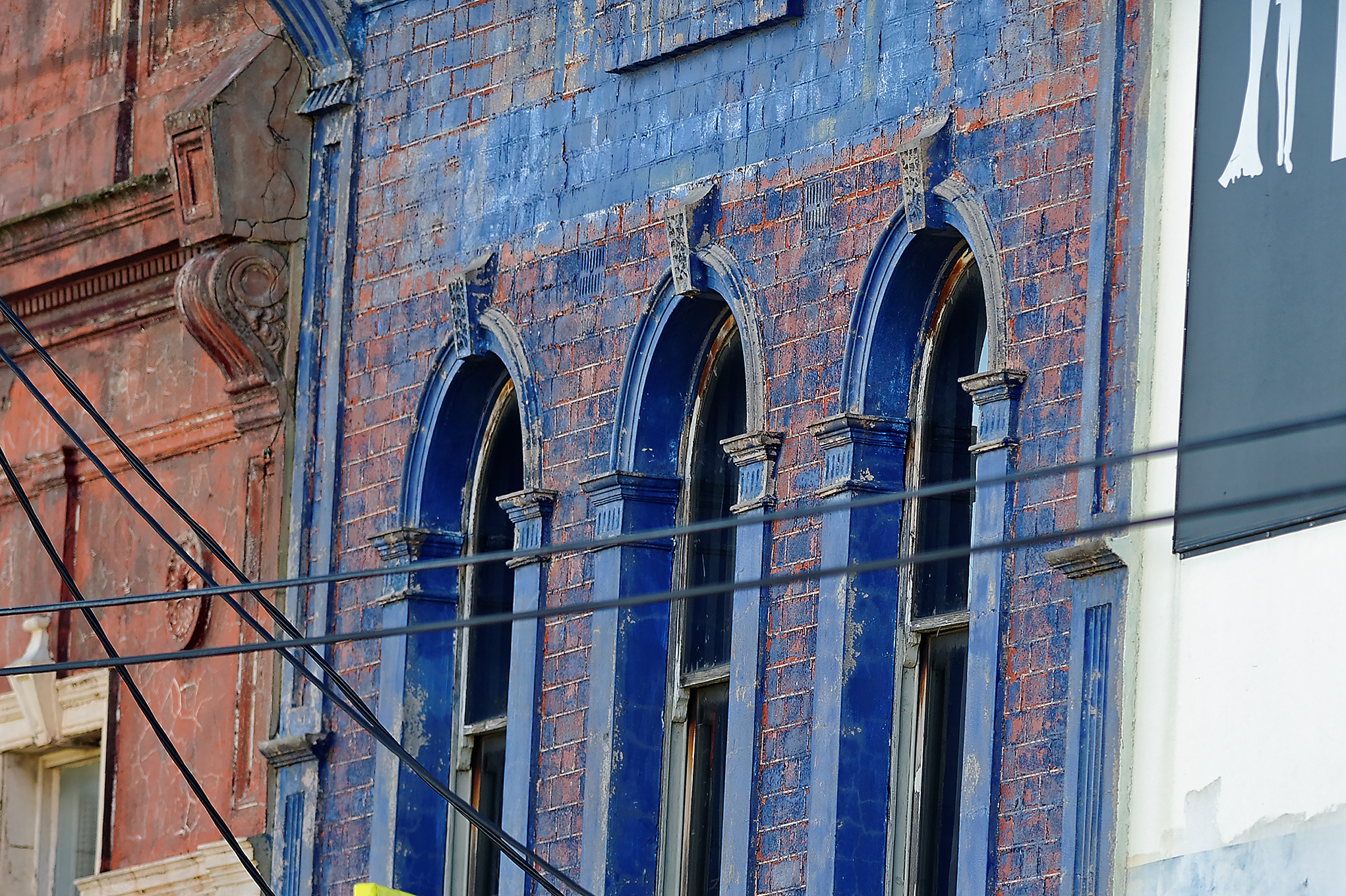
Buildings on Sydney Road, 2018

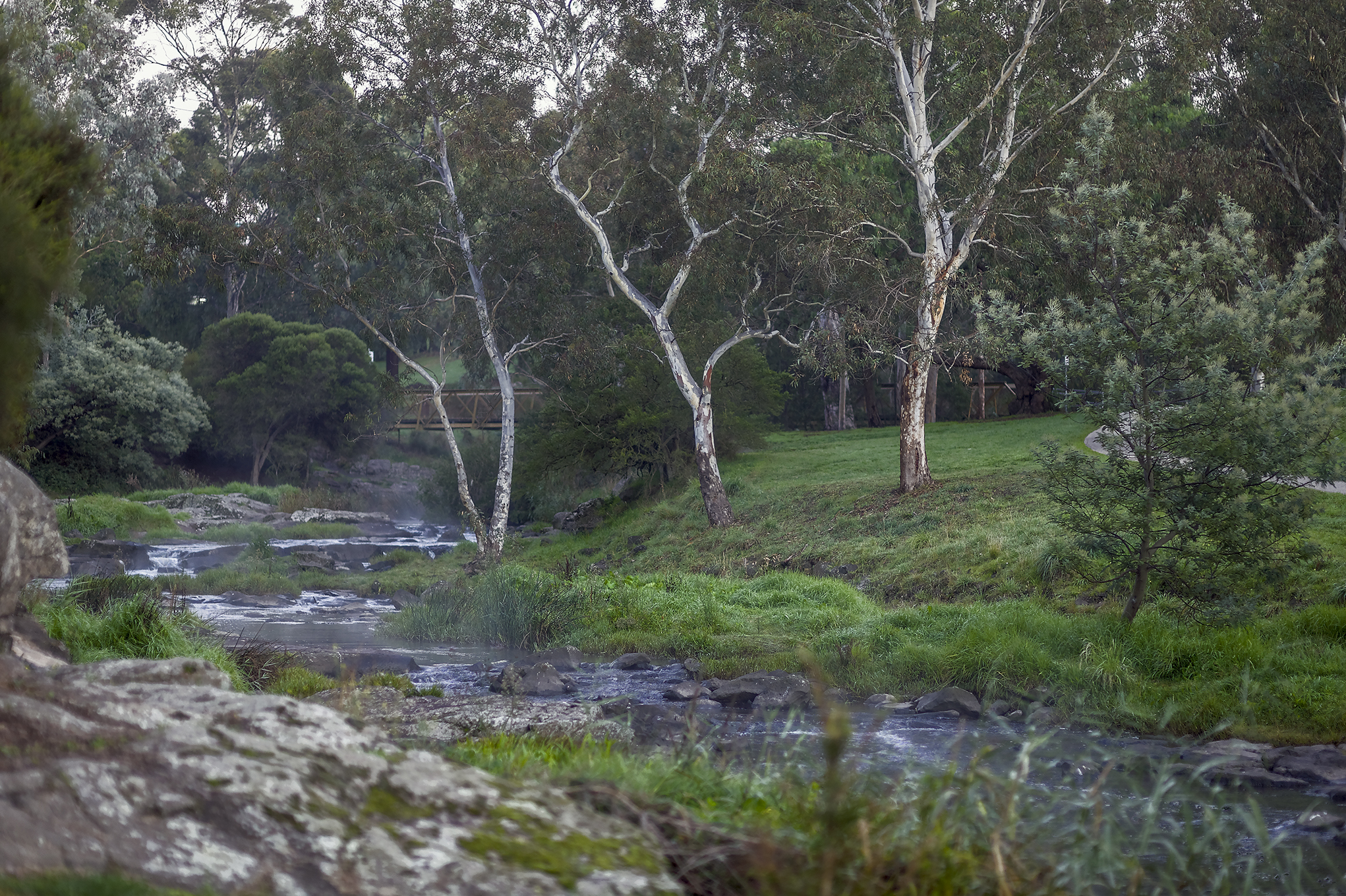
Merri Creek at Coburg Lake Reserve, 2021

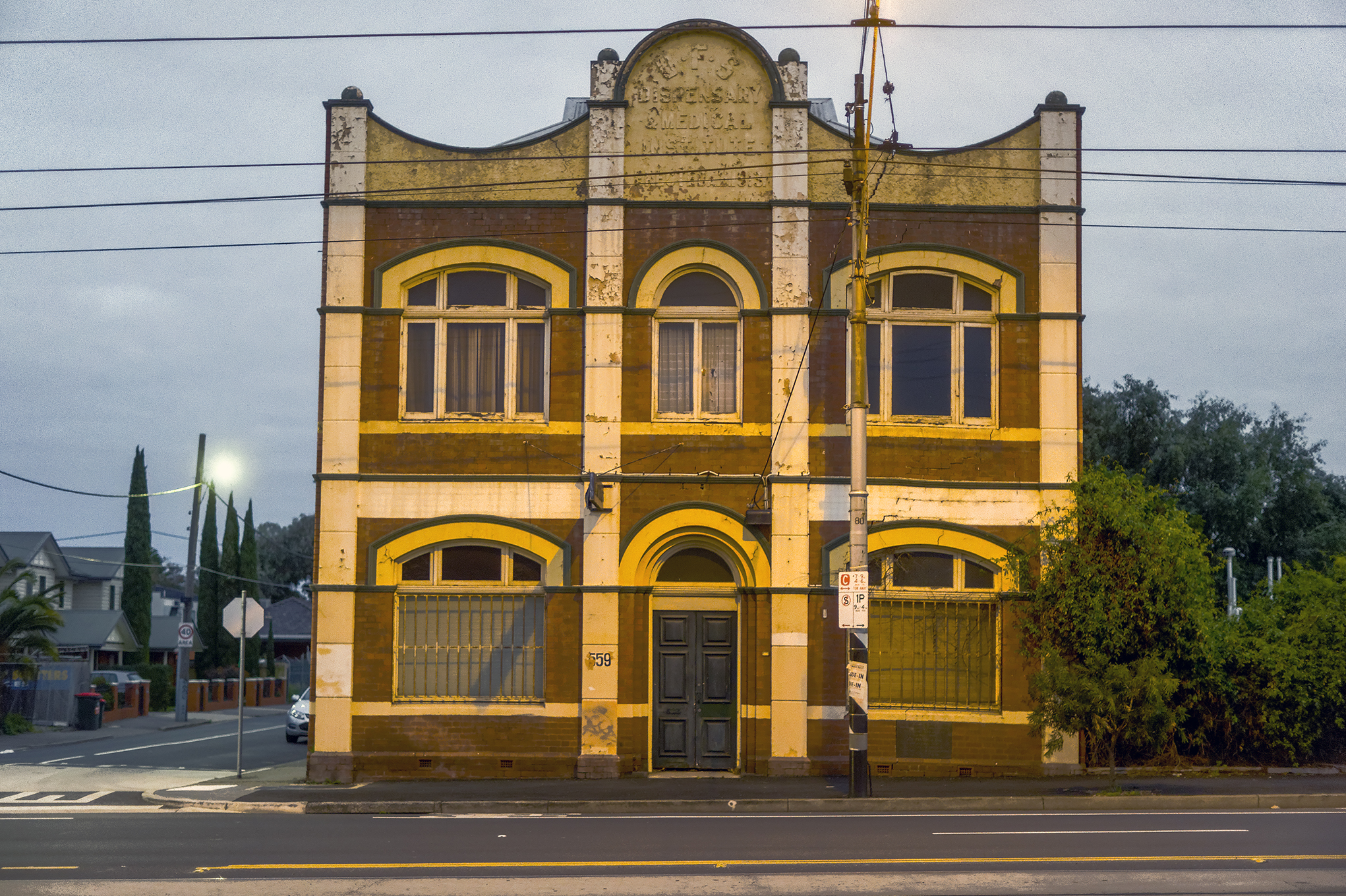
Former UFS Dispensary building, which opened in 1913, on Sydney Road, 2020

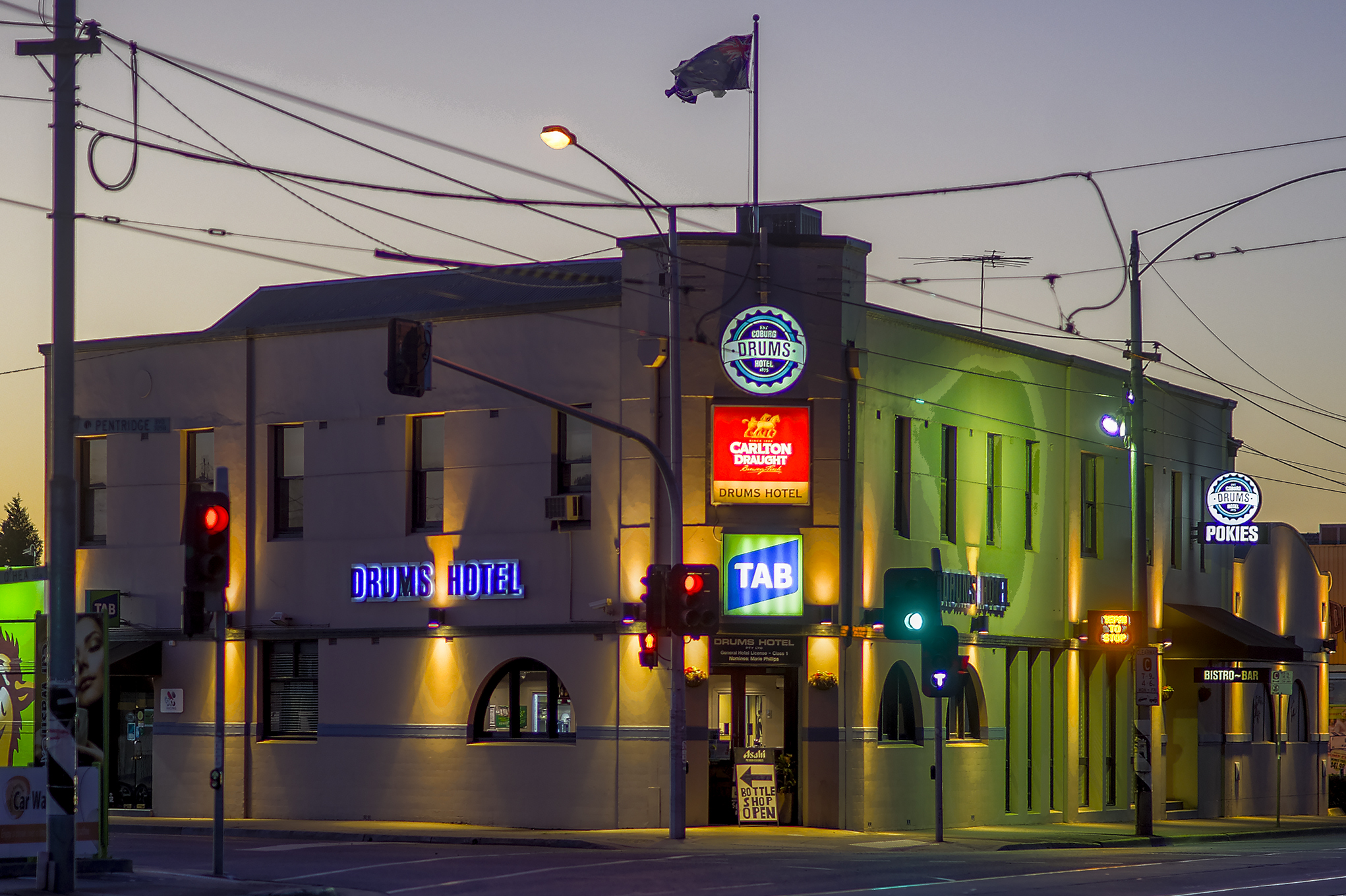
Drums Hotel

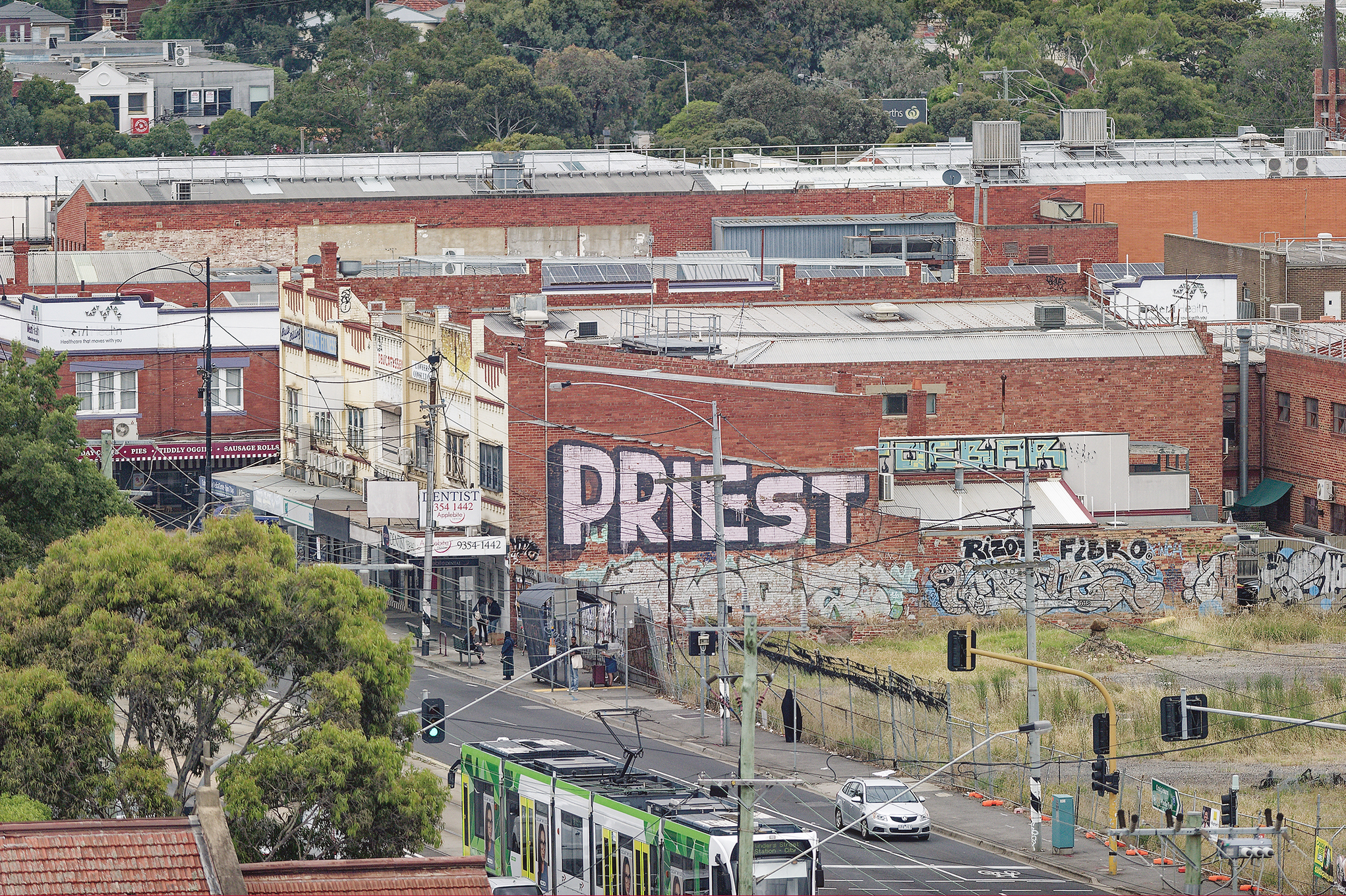
Bell Street Fitness building, 2025

=== Heritage listings ===
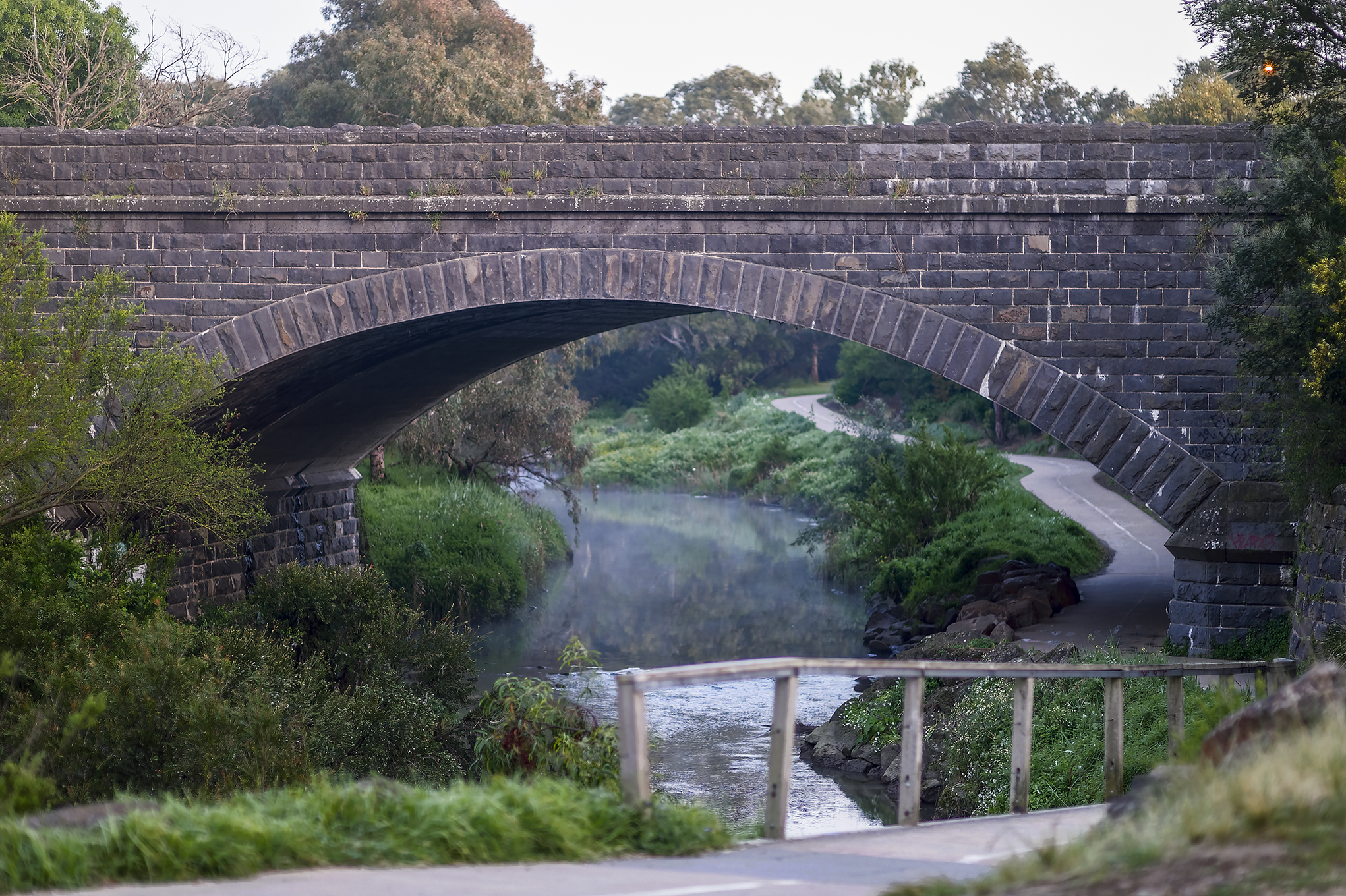
Murray Road Bridge over Merri Creek, built 1871

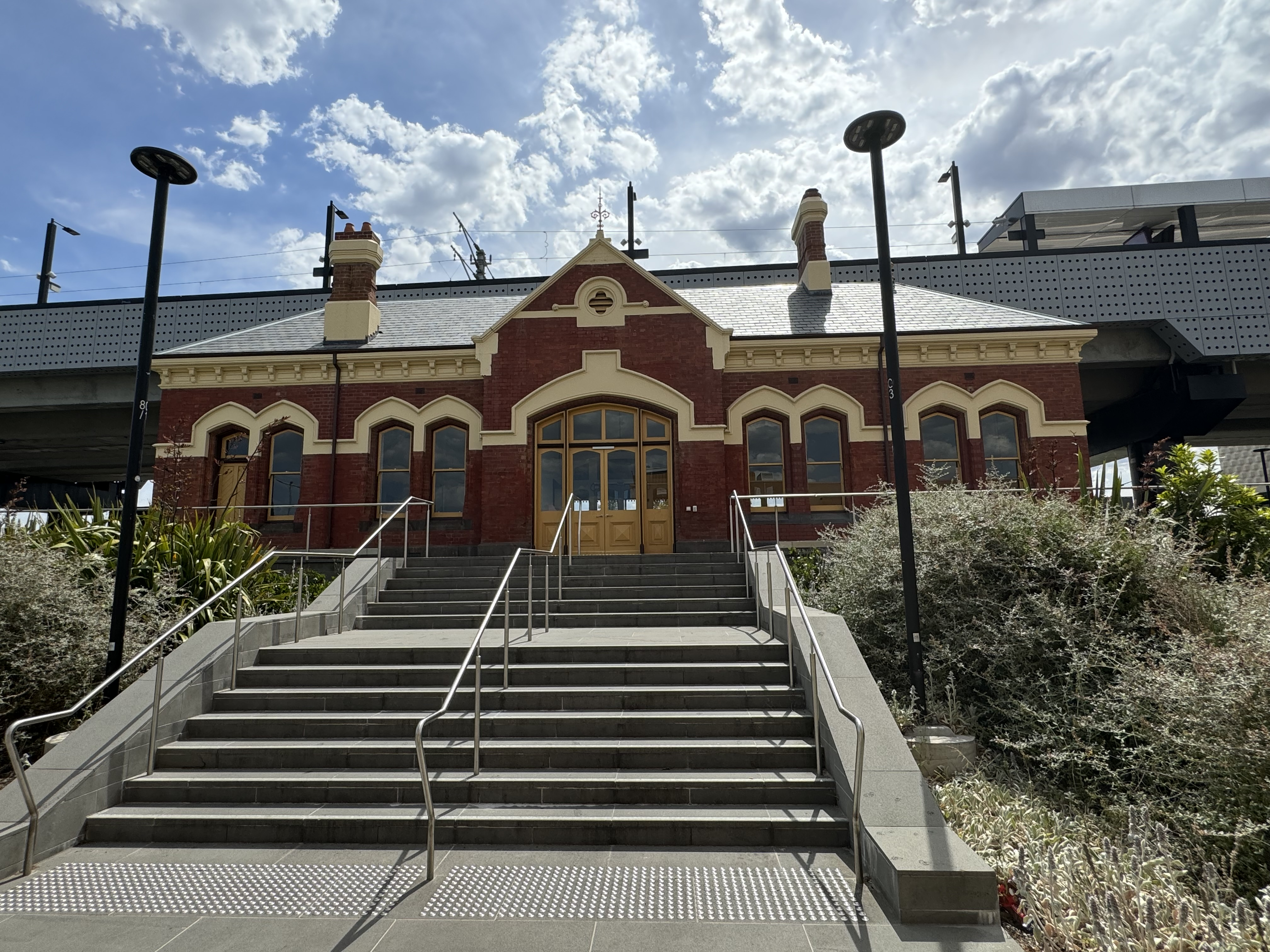
Part of the Coburg line, the former railway station, 2024

The following places in Coburg are listed on the Victorian Heritage Register:

- The American Cottage, 21 Station Street
- Arundel, 42 Ross Street
- Bates building (former), 400–404 Sydney Road
- Bluestone Cottage Museum, 82 Bell Street
- Coburg Primary School (No. 484), Infant Building and Shelter Shed, 83–85 Bell Street
- Coburg railway line (former) (Note: The heritage curtail is extensive and includes seven distinct precincts that contain 19th century station buildings and platforms at Coburg, Moreland, Jewell and Brunswick; and substations, signal boxes, gatekeeper cabins, remnant interlocking and safe-working equipment, levers and rodding, signals, gates and industrial sidings.)
- Glencairn, 6 Craigrossie Avenue
- The Grange, 39 Belgrave Street
- Holy Trinity Anglican Church Complex, 520 Sydney Road
- Murray Road Bridge, over the Merri Creek
- Newlands Road Bridge, over the Merri Creek
- HM Prison Pentridge (former), Champ Street
- Truby King Baby Health Centre, Elm Grove
- Wesleyan Methodist Church (former), 512 Sydney Road and Bell Street

Places protected by Heritage Overlay controls in the Merri-bek planning scheme are also located in Coburg.

== Notable people ==
- Angry Anderson, rock singer
- Raelene Boyle, sprinter
- Phil Cleary, Australian footballer and politician
- Herbert Nelson Davis (1899–1963), former organist, choirmaster and conductor
- Ted Egan, folk singer
- Dean Jones, cricketer
- Vasili Kanidiadis, host of Vasili's Garden
- Syd Lucas (1900–2008), former English Australian, a long-living Tommy of World War I
- Jock McHale, Australian rules footballer
- Gerald Murnane, writer
- Peter Norman (1942–2006), former track and field competitor
- Rod Quantock
- Bruce White (1916–1984), former Royal Australian Air Force navigator
