= Murray Road Bridge =

Heritage-listed bridge over the Merri Creek in Melbourne, Victoria, Australia

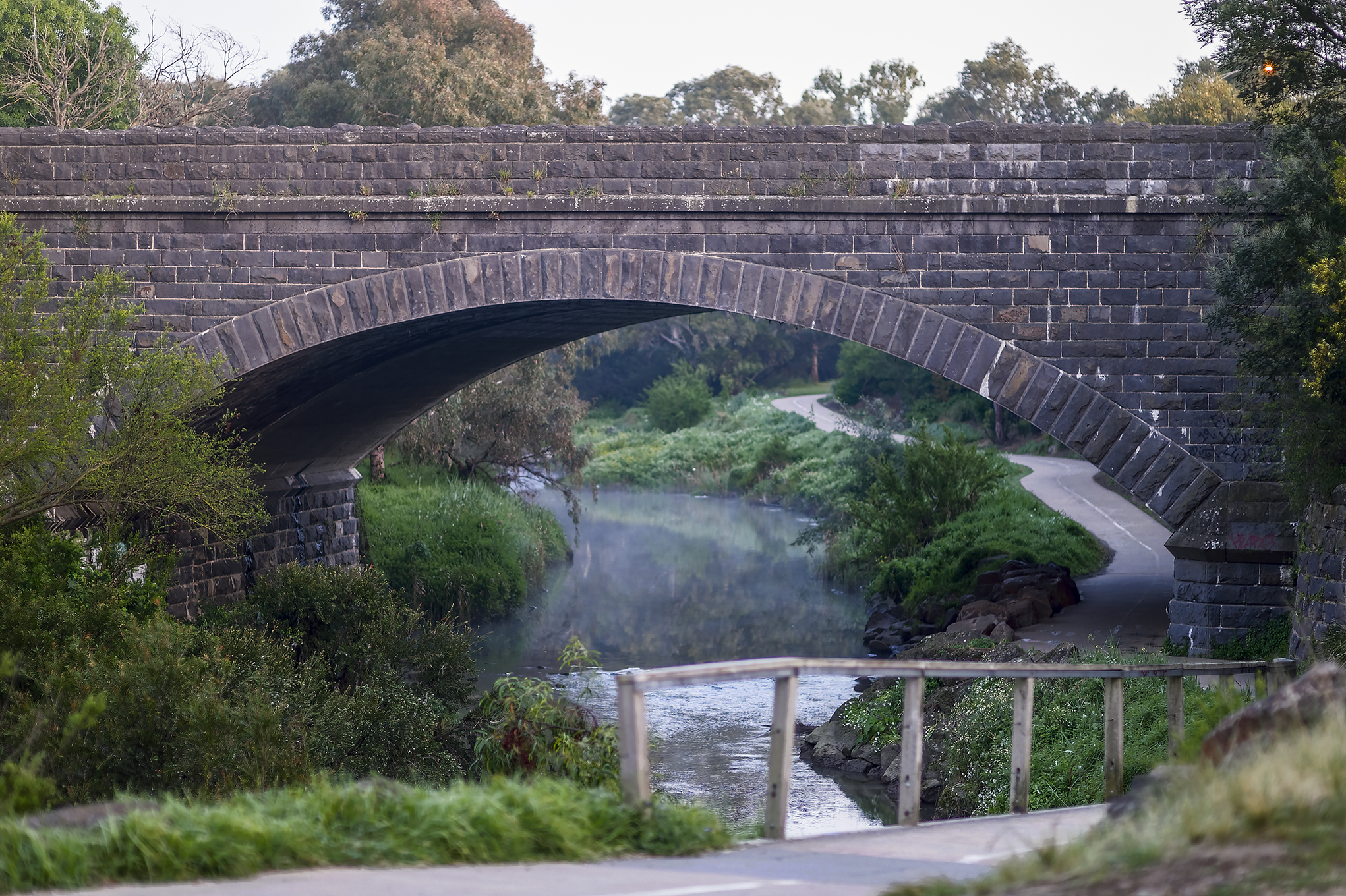
- The bridge in 2020
- Coordinates: 37°44′07″S 144°58′35″E
- Carries: Murray Road
- Crosses: Merri Creek; Merri Creek Trail
- Locale: Melbourne, Victoria, Australia
- Begins: Murray Road, Coburg (east)
- Ends: Murray Road, Coburg (west)
- Preceded by: Newlands Road Bridge
- Followed by: De Chene Bridge (pedestrian)

Characteristics
- Design: Arch bridge
- Material: Bluestone
- Total length: 25.9 m (85 ft)
- Longest span: 25.9 m (85 ft)
- No. of spans: One
- No. of lanes: 1: (1871–1962); 2: (since 1962– )

History
- Architect: Claude Farie
- Constructed by: Pentridge Stockade convicts
- Built: 1870–1871
- Opened: 1871; 155 years ago

Victorian Heritage Register
- Official name: Bridge over Merri Creek, Murray Road
- Type: Registered place
- Designated: 19 September 1996
- Reference no.: H1998
- Heritage overlay no.: HO122
- Category: Transport - Road

Location
- Interactive map of Murray Road Bridge

The Murray Road Bridge, also known as the Merri Creek Bridge, is an arch stone road bridge across the Merri Creek and its associated trail, constructed by Victorian convicts, that carries Murray Road, located in Coburg, an inner northern suburb of Melbourne, in Victoria, Australia. Built in 1871, the bridge was added to the Victorian Heritage Register on 19 September 1996 in recognition of its architectural, historic and scientific importance.

== History ==
The Murray Road Bridge was built by Pentridge Stockade convict labour for the Coburg District Road Board. It was commissioned in 1870 and completed in 1871. Bluestone for the large single span bridge was extracted by prisoners from a quarry situated within the penal reserve but outside the walls of the prison. The bridge was constructed during the short administration of Claude Farie, the fourth Inspector General of Prison Establishments, and formerly Sheriff of Melbourne. Farie died in August 1870 before the bridge was completed, and his name is memorialised on the foundation stone.

In 1962 the bridge was doubled in width on the north side by the Country Roads Board.

== Description ==
The 25.9-metre-long (85 ft) single span arch bridge built to carry Murray Road across the Merri Creek was constructed using bluestone quarried by convict labour. The bridge is historically significant for its association with Victoria's Pentridge Prison. It was built during a phase in Victoria's penal history when prisoners were employed outside the prison walls on quarrying and construction works around Melbourne. It is one of the few public structures built by convicts from the Pentridge Stockade that is known to survive.

The bridge is architecturally and scientifically significant for its single span, making it one of the largest, segmental, single arch stone bridges in Victoria, and the largest known bridge to be built by prison labour.

== See also ==
- List of bridges in Melbourne
- List of places on the Victorian Heritage Register in the City of Merri-bek
