= Thomas Johnson (murderer) =

Australian convicted murderer

Thomas William Johnson
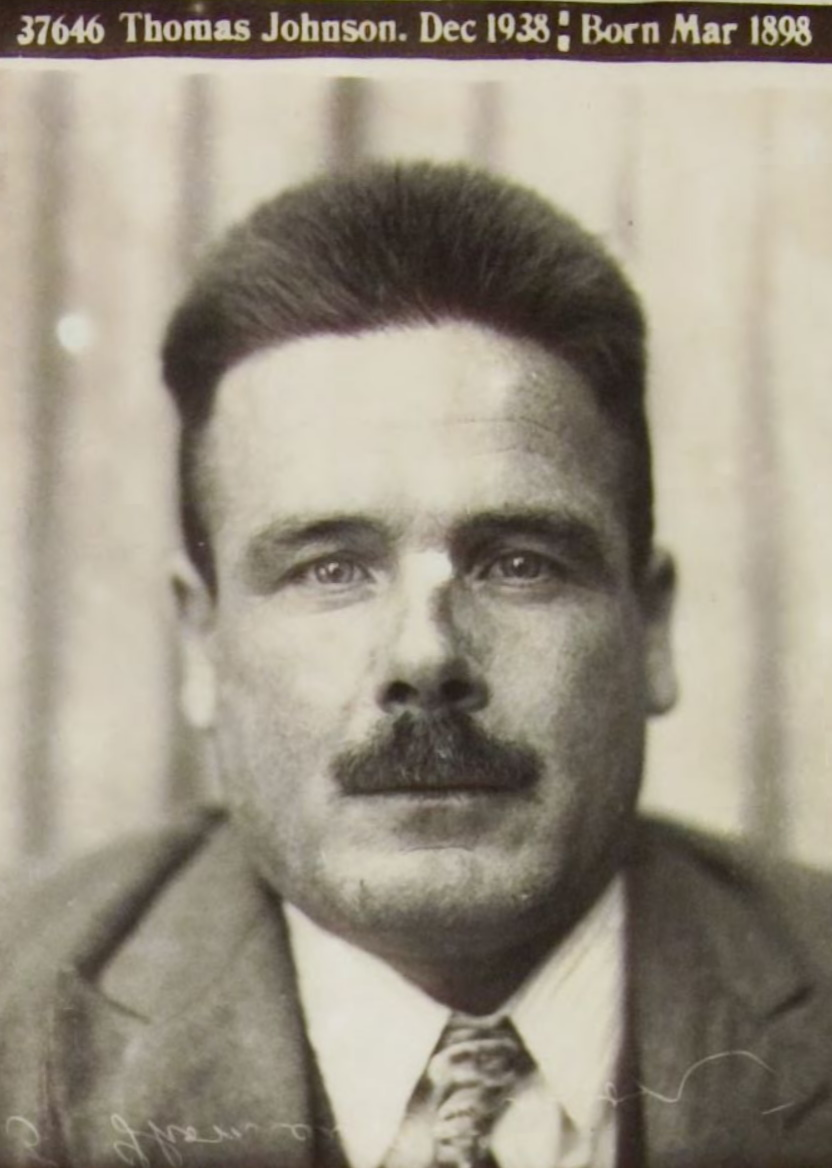
- Thomas Johnson, photographed in December 1938.
- Born: March 1898; Tasmania, Australia
- Died: 23 January 1939 (aged 40); HM Prison Pentridge, Victoria, Australia
- Other names: John Brown, Thomas W. Johnston
- Occupations: Billiard marker, Itinerant labourer
- Status: Executed by hanging
- Convictions: Murder; Assault; Robbery
- Penalty: Death

Thomas William Johnson (1898 – 23 January 1939) murdered two residents of a boarding house in the delicensed Windsor Castle Hotel in Dunolly, Victoria, in October 1938. He was an itinerant labourer with a record of violence and petty crime. Johnson confessed to the brutal killings, but at his trial he pleaded not guilty for reason of insanity. He was convicted and executed at Pentridge Prison in January 1939. Johnson was the fourth of eleven people to be hanged at Pentridge Prison after the closure of Melbourne Gaol in 1924.

== Biography ==
=== Early life ===
Johnson was born in Tasmania (possibly Burnie) in March 1898. He was from a family of thirteen children, nine girls and four boys. When Johnson was a child (his sister Lucy later recalled), he was prone to "outbursts of violent temper after which he did not remember anything". On one occasion, when Johnson was about ten years of age, he hit his father with a knife hone and then kicked him. By 1925 Johnson was living in Victoria.

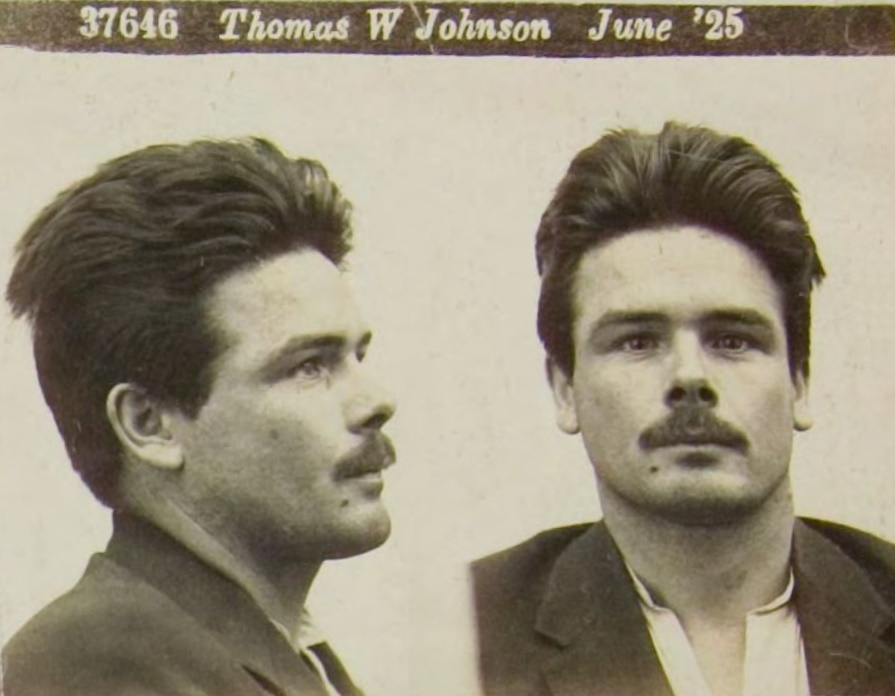
Police identification photographs of Thomas W. Johnson (June 1925).

=== Criminal offences ===
Thomas Johnson's first serious encounter with the Victorian criminal justice system was in February 1925. At that time he was working at Rainbow in north-west Victoria as a billiard marker, employed to keep the score of billiard matches and to replenish drinks. On 3 February 1925 Johnson appeared before the Rainbow Court of Petty Sessions, charged with having, on the day before at the Commonwealth Hotel in Rainbow, unlawfully destroyed a billiard tablecloth and twelve cues, the property of the licensee, S. H. Patterson. Johnson was found guilty and sentenced to two months' imprisonment.

On 16 June 1925 Johnson was sentenced at Ararat to six months hard labour for "wilfully malicious damage to property"; he was initially detained in Ballarat Gaol, from where he was transferred to Pentridge Prison in suburban Melbourne. In November 1925 Johnson was transferred to Castlemaine Gaol. Four weeks later, in early December 1925, he was transferred to the McLeod prison farm on French Island in Western Port. On 10 November 1926 Johnson was released on parole by the Indeterminate Sentences Board (in the belief that prospects for his reform were sufficient to justify such an action).

=== The assault at Toolamba ===
In early-December 1926 Johnson met a man named Joseph Corp in Melbourne and the two decided to go fruit-picking together. They travelled by rail to Seymour and then walked the 37 miles to Toolamba in the Goulburn Valley (eight miles south of Shepparton), where they found work picking fruit on William Pyke's orchard. Johnson and Corp camped on Pyke's land, sharing the same tent. On Sunday, 2 January 1927, the pair spent the day at the camp; at seven o'clock in the evening Johnson left to walk to Toolamba, where he participated in a card game and lost money. He returned just after eleven o'clock that night and settled down for the night. Joseph Corp had five pounds in cash in his trousers pocket, and used the trousers as a pillow. At just after five o'clock the following morning Corp woke up with his head and bedding covered in blood after having been struck with a shifting spanner. The blow left a jagged wound on his upper left temple and fractured his skull. His trousers were found on the other side of the tent, the five pounds missing from the pocket. Johnson had left, leaving behind his belongings, including his hat and some clothes.

Pyke bandaged Corp's wound and conveyed him to the Mooroopna police station and then to the nearby hospital. Later the same day Johnson was spotted at Tatura by Senior-constable Burke. He gave his name as "Smith" and denied he had been at Pyke's orchard. When the Mooroopna police arrived, Johnson was taken by car to Pyke's orchard where Mrs. Pyke identified the man as "Corp's tent mate". He was taken before the Police Magistrate and committed for trial in the Melbourne Supreme Court on 15 February.

In the Supreme Court of Victoria on 15 February 1927 Johnson was found guilty and sentenced to twelve months imprisonment for the robbery and wounding of Joseph Corp, and a further charge of breaching the conditions of his parole. He was initially incarcerated in Pentridge Prison, but transferred to Beechworth Gaol in August 1928. Johnson was freed on parole on 1 December 1930.

=== Further criminal activity ===
- In January 1933 in the Melbourne Court of Petty Sessions Johnson was fined two pounds (or 14 days imprisonment) for having used indecent language.
- At the Melbourne Court of Petty Sessions on 1 August 1936 Johnson was sentenced to three months imprisonment for unlawful assault, in addition to a fine of ten shillings (or 48 hours incarceration) for being drunk and disorderly. He served the time in Pentridge Prison and was released on 2 November 1936.
- On 15 April 1937 Johnson (as "John Brown") was fined two pounds (with ten shillings costs) or 14 days imprisonment for an unspecified charge (Melbourne Court of Petty Sessions).
- In the Castlemaine Court of Petty Sessions on 17 June 1937 Johnson was sentenced to two months imprisonment for larceny. He was incarcerated in Bendigo Gaol and released on 14 August 1937.
- On 21 October 1937, two months after he had been released, Johnson was sentenced to four months imprisonment for larceny in the Bendigo Court of Petty Sessions); he was returned to the Bendigo Gaol where he served his sentence and was released on 16 February 1938.

=== The Dunolly murders ===
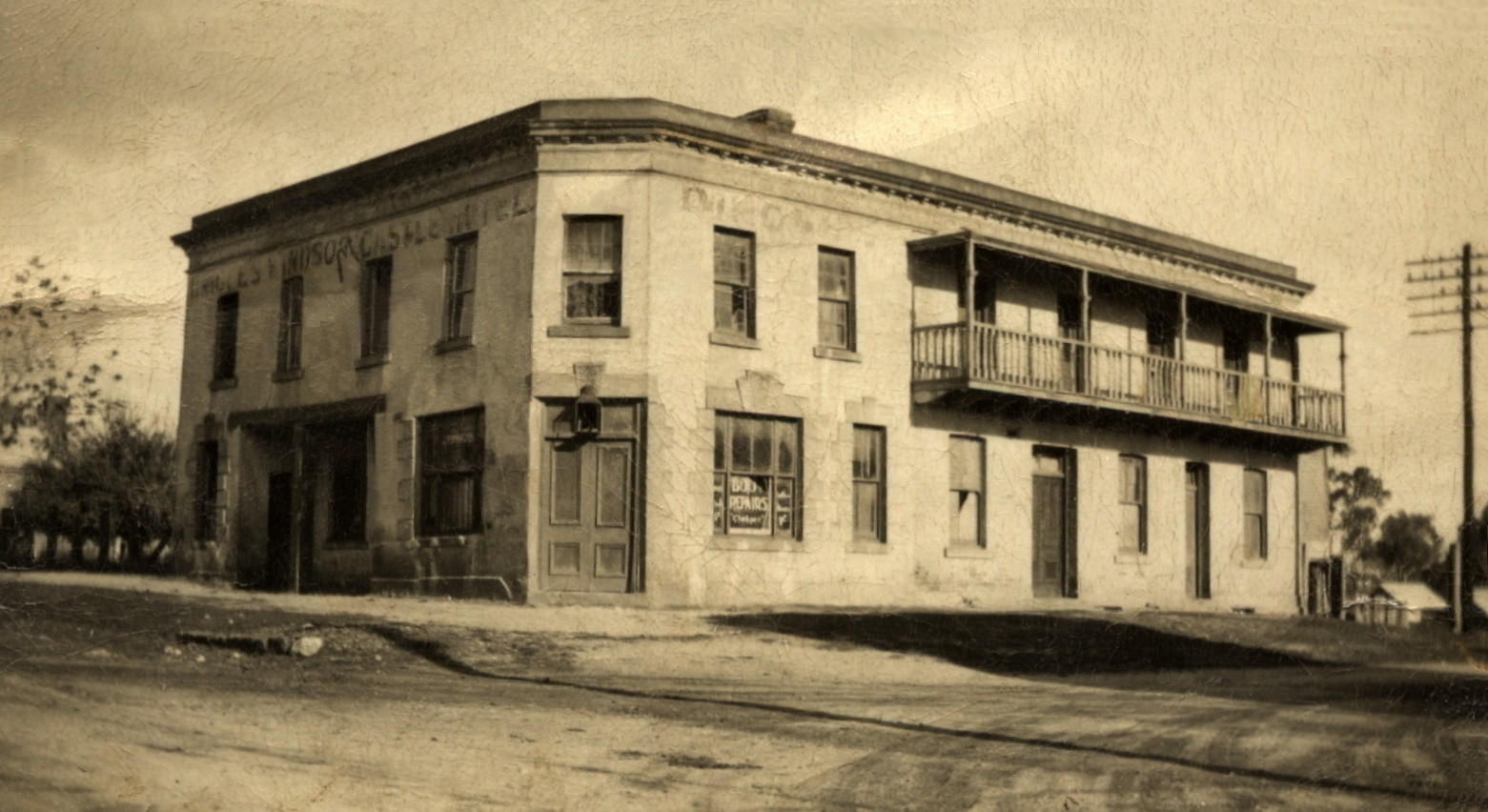
The delicensed Windsor Castle Hotel at Dunolly, used as a boarding house prior to its destruction by fire in July 1939.

On Monday, 3 October 1938, Thomas Johnson was staying in the delicensed Windsor Castle Hotel in Dunolly when he murdered two long-term residents of the building. He had arrived there on 26 September and occupied a room on the ground floor. Johnson said he was "on sustenance" and wanted to live at the boarding house, "but could not pay". The Windsor Castle Hotel, located on the corner of Broadway and Hardy streets in Dunolly, had lost its license in June 1912 when the Licenses Reduction Board delicensed seven hotels in and around Dunolly. The building had become run down and by the 1930s was operating as a low-rent boarding house.

Johnson was one of five men living at the Windsor Castle when the murders occurred. According to a statement he later gave to the police, on 3 October at about three o'clock in the afternoon Johnson was in his room on the ground floor trying to sleep. Another resident, a 73-year-old pensioner and prospector, Robert Gray, was in his room on the top floor "hammering and making a loud noise". Johnson took an axe and went upstairs, entered the room and "hit Gray on the head with it and he fell on the floor". Another resident, 61 year-old pensioner and returned serviceman, Charles Bunney, heard the noise and came to investigate. As stated by Johnson: "I then hit Bunney with the axe on the head... I did not want Bunney to be a witness and that was the reason I killed him". Johnson then locked Gray's door with a small padlock and went outside and threw away the key. In his statement, Johnson claimed he was sober at the time and added, "I often get into a bad temper and I was in a bad temper when I killed Gray".

Further information about the events preceding the murders were later provided by witnesses at the coronial inquest and Johnson's subsequent trial. Lancelot Cazneau, a pensioner and resident of the Windsor Castle, gave evidence at the coroner's inquest that he had previously lent his axe to Johnson to split wood. On the morning of the murder Gray, Bunney and Johnson had been seen together, drinking at the bar of the Railway Hotel in Dunolly, together with Cazneau and a pensioner named William Alexander. That afternoon Cazneau saw Johnson, who told him he was going upstairs to "see old Gray" to borrow "a couple of bob". Cazneau told Johnson he was unlikely to get anything from Gray, to which Johnson replied, "Oh, he will lend it to me".

Johnson slept at the Windsor Castle for two nights following the murders, contemplating ways to cover up his crime. On the day after the killings, in an apparent attempt to set up an alibi, Johnson paid a shilling for a ride to Maryborough, 14 miles south of Dunolly. At the Flagstaff Hotel he spoke to a salesman, Herbert Turner, and told him he had been "on the tear" with a returned soldier the day before, during which the man had fallen in a dam three times, claiming his friend always "made a welter of it" when he got his pension. He told the salesman the man had not slept in his bed, so Johnson had assumed he was out "on the tear" again. Later the same day, Johnson paid for a ride back to Dunolly. That afternoon William Alexander asked Johnson if he had seen Bunney; Johnson replied that "he might have gone prospecting and fallen in a hole". Later Alexander went with Johnson and "searched a dam for Bunney". Johnson later admitted to the police that he thought of burning the hotel down, but realised the other two residents would raise the alarm and probably stop the blaze from spreading. He told the police, "it is different burning them cold and burning them hot". Johnson also thought of carrying the bodies to an old mine shaft, "but the mess in the room was too great, so I cleared out instead". He considered going to Sydney, but (as he told the police) "I knew I would have trouble in getting a lift dressed like I was". On Wednesday, 5 October, Johnson left Dunolly and returned to Maryborough (this time on foot). The next day he managed to get a ride in a transport truck to Melbourne. On the following day, 7 October, Johnson walked the 22 miles to Dandenong, on the south-east outskirts of Melbourne. That afternoon he walked into the Dandenong Police Station and surrendered to police, admitting to the killings in Dunolly. Despite being cautioned by Constable Kirkham that any statement may be used in evidence, Johnson gave the police a detailed description of his part in the murders.

The bodies were discovered on 6 October by William Radley, a shearer, and Frederick Douglas, a resident of the Windsor Castle Hotel. The two men had gone to Gray's room in the Windsor Castle and found his room padlocked and Bunney's nearby room open. They gained access to the verandah outside of Gray's room, from where they saw the bodies of Bunney and Gray lying on the floor inside, with axe wounds to their heads. A bloodstained axe was found in the corner of the room.

A coronial inquiry was held at Dunolly on Tuesday, 25 October, before the Deputy Coroner, William Belcher. Johnson attended the inquiry, but did not ask any questions and was not represented by counsel. The Deputy Coroner found that Johnson had murdered the two men and committed him for trial in the Supreme Court of Victoria at Ballarat on 13 December.

=== Trial and execution ===
Johnson was tried in the Supreme Court at Ballarat on 13 and 14 December 1938. After the charges of having murdered Bunney and Gray were read to him, Johnson pleaded not guilty. On the second day of the trial Johnson's defence counsel, Robert Monahan, disclosed that the basis of Johnson's not guilty plea was an insanity defence. Dr. Ellery, "a specialist in mental diseases" who had examined Johnson, gave evidence for the defence that the prisoner "was suffering from hereditary disease which made him periodically unsound mentally". He described Johnson as "pugnacious and aggressive, and callous pathologically", who "had head attacks which led to extreme violence". A contrary view was provided by Dr. Raymond Allan, a Coburg prison doctor. He described Johnson as a man of "low-grade mentality, but he was not insane", adding that the prisoner "was a callous type, and human life seemed to be nothing to him". After retiring for six hours the jury delivered a guilty verdict. The judge then sentenced Johnson to death for the murders of Charles Bunney and Robert Gray.

The date of Johnson's execution was set for 23 January 1939. Groups opposed to capital punishment began to urge the State government to grant a reprieve for Johnson. On 17 January a deputation met with Henry Bailey, the attorney-general; the group was led by the State opposition leader, John Cain, and was made up of representatives of the Labor Party, the Trades Hall Council and the Churches of Christ. Members maintained that "hanging was not a deterrent to murder and was repugnant to the Australian people". Attorney-General Bailey was unmoved, stating that the Cabinet had already considered the matter and "the law shall take its course".

Efforts to stop or postpone the execution continued until late into the night before the appointed day. Johnson was hanged at Pentridge Prison, Coburg, on 23 January 1939. On the morning of the hanging, when the prisoner was asked by the sheriff whether he had anything to say before the sentence of death was carried out, Johnson "indicated that he wished the execution to proceed". The preliminary legal formalities were gone through in Johnson's cell (not on the scaffold as had been the previous custom). No clergyman attended the execution (according to the wishes of the condemned man).

=== Aftermath ===
In July 1939 the delicensed Windsor Castle Hotel at Dunolly, the scene of the murders of Bunney and Gray nine months previously, was destroyed by fire. A resident on the opposite corner to the old hotel noticed a blaze in one of the rooms. He ran to the end of the building and smashed open a door to alert Charles Cazneau, the only occupant at the time. The two-storey building burned for three hours, during which the front wall crashed onto the footpath.

== Victims ==
- Robert McCord Gray – born about 1865; married Emily Sheridan in 1898 at Hillston, New South Wales; living at 'Nithsdale', Hillston; the couple had three children born at Hillston between 1899 and 1906. At the time of his death Gray was recorded as a "prospector and old-age pensioner", living in a room at the Windsor Castle boarding house at Dunolly. Robert Gray was murdered by Johnson on 3 October 1938 at Dunolly, aged about 73 years.
- Charles Adam Bunney – born in 1877 at Gobur, in north-east Victoria, the son of Adam Bunney and Matilda (née Nolan). Bunney served in the Boer War in 1901–2 with the 5th Victorian Mounted Rifles, during which he was taken as a prisoner-of-war by the Boer forces; he managed to escape and return to service. By 1914 he was working as a carpenter. He married Hettie Eliza Millard in 1914 in Victoria; a son, Charles Gavin Bunney, was born in 1915. Bunney enlisted in the Australian Imperial Force in August 1914 (D Company, 5th Battalion A.I.F.); he served at Gallipoli in 1915; promoted to lance-corporal in March 1916; wounded in action (left forearm) in June 1916; court-martialled for drunkenness at Boulogne in July 1916; rejoined his unit in Belgium in September 1916; served in France in 1917; furloughed to England in June 1918; returned to Australia aboard the Boonah, arriving in Melbourne in September 1918; discharged from the A.I.F. as medically unfit ("nervous debility"). In 1931 the family was living at Ferntree Gully; by 1937 Bunney was living at Dunolly; his wife, Hettie Bunney, died in 1937 at Hawthorn. At the time of his death Bunney was recorded as a "returned soldier pensioner", living in a room at the Windsor Castle boarding house at Dunolly. Charlie Bunney was murdered by Johnson on 3 October 1938 at Dunolly, aged about 61 years.
