= George Green (murderer) =

Australian murderer (1896 – 1939)

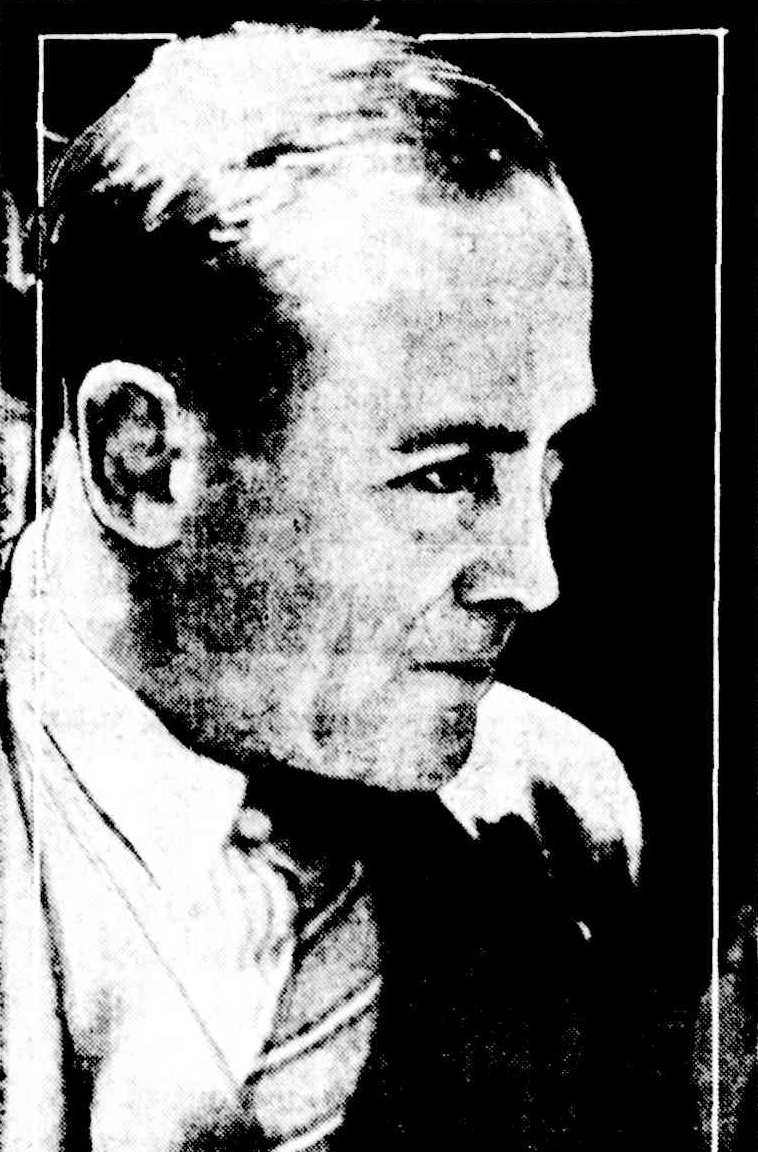
- George Green in 1939
- Born: 1896; Fitzroy, Victoria, Australia
- Died: 17 April 1939 (aged 43); HM Prison Pentridge, Victoria, Australia
- Other names: George Day; George May; Malcolm Dalgetty; George Porter
- Occupation: Chimney sweep
- Status: Executed by hanging
- Conviction: Murder (2 counts)
- Penalty: Death

George Green (1896 – 17 April 1939) was an Australian murderer, convicted of killing two women in November 1938 in the Melbourne suburb of Glenroy, Victoria. The case against Green substantially relied on circumstantial and forensic evidence. Green was executed at Pentridge Prison in April 1939. Green was the fifth of eleven people to be hanged at Pentridge Prison after the closure of Melbourne Gaol in 1924.

== Biography ==
=== Early life and crimes ===
George Green was born in 1896 in the inner Melbourne suburb of Fitzroy, the son of Thomas Green and Ada Kennedy.

In 1912 George Green, aged 16 years, was charged with stealing a football from Frank Kelsey at the Powlett Reserve, East Melbourne. In 1919 Green was described as a ward of the State, with relatives residing in Napier Street, Fitzroy. He was reported to be in possession of a suit of clothes belonging to Ernest Summerland, stolen from the St. Kilda Baths. Green served several gaol sentences and was known to the police under a number of aliases: George Day, George May, Malcolm Dalgetty and George Porter. He committed offences in New South Wales and Victoria, which included theft, assault, resisting the police and indecent language. In about 1936 he was convicted of robbery in company, for which he received 12 months imprisonment.

Since about 1933 Green "worked in the sewer", but by late 1938 he had begun working as a chimney sweep. In evidence given at his trial Green claimed he had worked as a chimney sweep as early as about 1933. By November 1938 Green was living with the Aitken family in Bamfield Road, West Heidelberg. The householders, Alexander and Isabella Aitken, were the parents of Violet Read (or Reid), with whom Green had lived for a number of years. Read left the household a few days before Green's arrest in mid-November 1939.

=== Glenroy murders ===
On Saturday night, 12 November 1938, Miss Annie Wiseman, aged 63 years, and her niece, Miss Phyllis Wiseman, aged 17 years, were attacked by an intruder and strangled in their home in the northern Melbourne suburb of Glenroy. The murdered women were discovered the following morning, each in their respective bedrooms, by Laura Barrett, sister of the older woman. The brick house, owned by Annie Wiseman, was on the corner of Melbourne Avenue and Salisbury Street, opposite the Glenroy railway station; it stood well back from the street and was surrounded by an extensive garden. The Government pathologist subsequently determined that Phyllis Wiseman had died of asphyxia caused by pressure on her neck, probably from "having been forced against the angle iron of the bed". Annie Wiseman died "due to asphyxia from throttling", with bruises at the back of her head "consistent with her having been bumped up and down on the floor". There were also indications that the younger woman had been sexually assaulted.

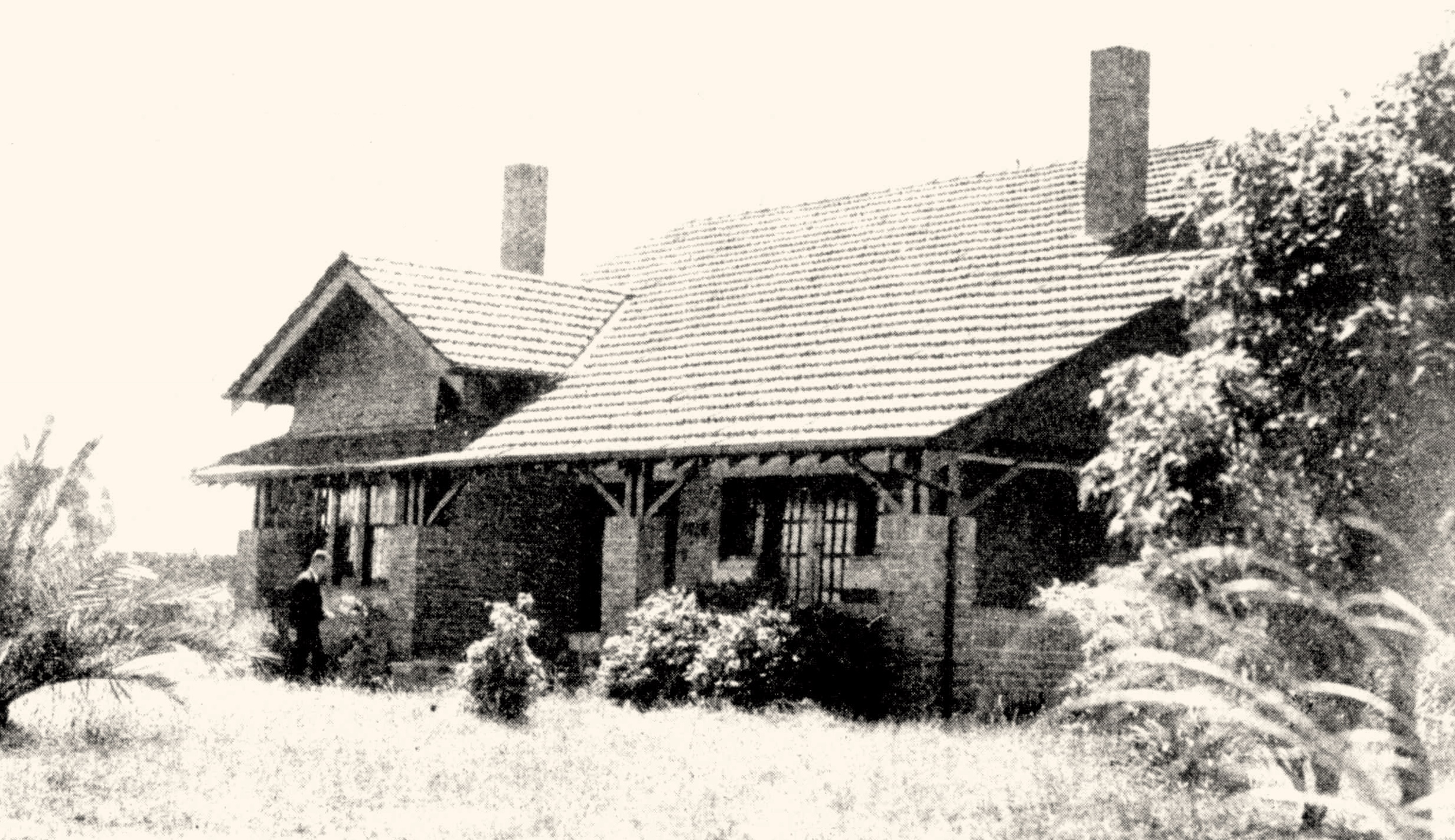
Annie Wiseman's house in Glenroy

Detectives investigating the scene found that the sill of one of the front bedroom windows had been wiped clean with a wet towel. A number of burnt matches were found strewn on the floor of both bedrooms and the bathroom, indicating the killer had used them for light as he carried out his crimes. A shopping bag was found in the bathroom, its contents, including a quantity of small change, scattered over the floor. Beside the body of the elder woman a policeman found a piece of paper folded in four – a portion of a receipted milk bill given to a Mrs. Olive Thomas in September 1938. On the back of the paper was written "Mrs. Hewitt, 118 Collins Street, Thornbury". When Mrs. Thomas, living in Coburg, was interviewed by detectives she told them that a chimney sweep named George Green had called at her house on November 7. She had informed Green of a house in Thornbury with chimneys she knew were dirty, it being a house she had recently vacated and had sold to Mary Hewitt. Green indicated he might call there. Mrs. Thomas had written Hewitt's address on a section torn off the top of the milk bill receipt (the portion showing her name and her previous Thornbury Street address) to show Mrs. Hewitt it was she who had sent the chimney sweep.

As a result of the evidence of the milkman's receipt found at the murder scene, and the subsequent information given by Olive Thomas, the local police were instructed to search for George Green, now a suspect in the Glenroy murder investigation. On November 17 Constable Francis Maher apprehended Green as he left a house in Fairfield and brought him to the Thornbury Police Station. From Thornbury Green was taken to the Detective Office in Russell Street. Green admitted to receiving the note from Mrs. Thomas in Coburg, but claimed to have later given it to "two sweeps at Merlynston".

When asked about his movements during the afternoon and night of Saturday, November 12, Green said he went by bicycle to the Sir Henry Barkly Hotel in Heidelberg in the afternoon. He said he left the hotel at about 6.30 p.m., at which stage he was "pretty full". As he cycled away, near Victoria Street Green asserted that he got off the bicycle to have a "sleep off" on a vacant allotment. When he woke during the night he returned to the house in Bamfield Road, arriving there at about one o'clock on the Sunday morning.

The police were now confident the evidence they had gathered indicated that Green was in the house on the night if the murders. He was charged with the murders of the two women at Glenroy and at the City Court on November 18, he was remanded in custody to enable police to carry out further inquiries.

=== Gathering of evidence ===
The Government Analyst, Charles Taylor, was given the task of examining clothing from the murder scene and the suspected murderer. He found white hairs on Green's brown coat, inside the leg of the trousers and on the lining of the vest. These hairs were identical with hairs Taylor had collected from the collar of Annie Wiseman's dressing gown and from the carpet of the front bedroom. He also examined Annie Wiseman's hair in the City Morgue and found they were identical in colour and texture, and similar in length to the other hairs he had examined.

The analyst examined dirt from Green's clothing and found that it consisted of soot, sand grains and mineral ash. A mark found on Annie Wiseman's pyjamas, "which looked as though a dirty hand had grabbed them", contained carbon particles. He also found smears of blood and dirt consisting of carbon particles on Phyllis Wiseman's pyjamas.

On November 22 a railway cleaner found a nickel-plated bicycle pump beside the railway line at Glenroy opposite the house where the murders had occurred, and handed it to the police. When Detective Delmenico examined the bicycle pump, he found a hair adhering to the rubber connection. He took it to the Government Analyst, who determined it was a horsehair. Samples of hair were later taken from a chestnut horse belonging to Alexander Aitken, in whose house Green was living, which were identical in colour, texture and length to the hair found on the bicycle pump connection. The connection was also found to contain particles of soot, sand grains and mineral dust.

Police and several Aboriginal trackers investigated the ground in the vicinity of the house at Glenroy on November 22. Tyre tracks were found that indicated a bicycle had been wheeled along a sandy path near the house, across the railway line, over a fence and onto the main road. Bicycle tyre tracks with the same imprint were identified within the grounds of Annie Wiseman's house, which matched the tyre pattern of Green's bicycle. Boot imprints were also found in the yard as well as near the railway line. The boot marks found at the scene corresponded to the boots worn by Green. A railway ganger named Henry Hewitt of Glenroy told police he had seen a man enter the front gate of Miss Wiseman's house at about 10.20 p.m. on November 12. The man was wheeling a bicycle, but Hewitt said he was unable to identify him.

Maureen Brannigan of Glenroy related a conversation to police that she had with Green when he cleaned the chimney of her house in July 1938. The chimney sweep had told her that Miss Wiseman "was a very good woman" who "always read a chapter of the Bible to him when he was sweeping her chimneys, and usually gave him a couple of shillings more than his usual change". For his part, Green denied he had ever cleaned chimneys at Miss Wiseman's house, claiming he had only ever canvassed there.

An inquest into the deaths of Annie and Phyllis Wiseman was held by the City Coroner on 19 and 20 December 1939 at the Melbourne City Morgue. Green, being held in custody, attended the inquest, as did his solicitor.

=== Trial and sentencing ===
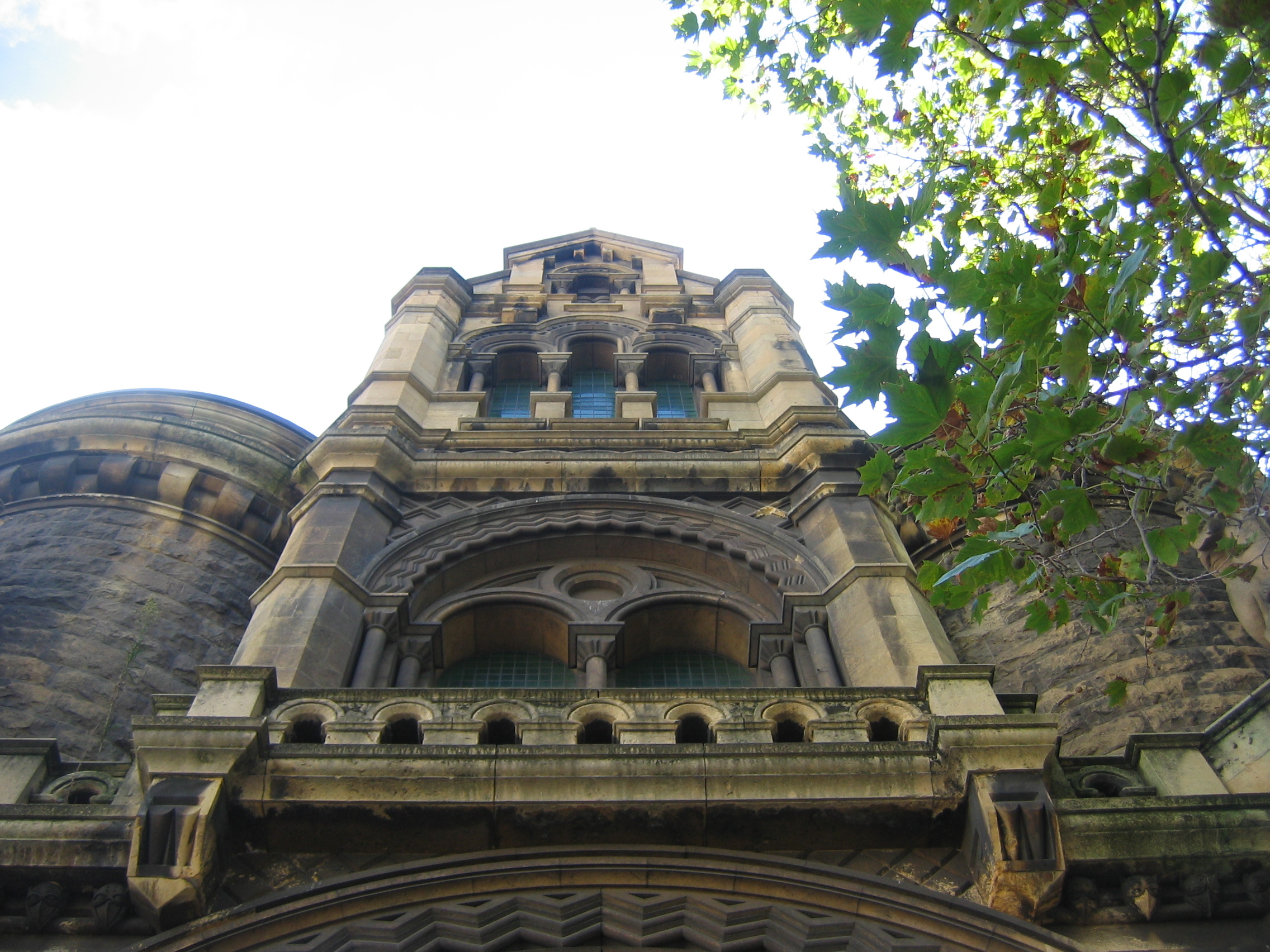
The tower above the entrance to the former Melbourne Criminal Court on the corner of La Trobe and Russell streets (now part of the Royal Melbourne Institute of Technology).

The trial of George Green commenced on Monday, 20 February 1939, in the Melbourne Criminal Court before Justice Lowe. The accused man pleaded not guilty to the charges. Green was defended by the barrister, Leo Little (instructed by the solicitor, Joseph Barnett). In his opening address the Crown Prosecutor, Clifford Book, said the Crown's case relied on circumstantial evidence. He observed that the intruder had probably entered the house in order to steal, but “he did not hesitate to kill the women in the commission of his crime”. Book explained that the portion of a milk bill found beside Annie Wiseman's body was the primary piece of evidence which pointed to the accused. The docket had obviously been left behind inadvertently by the murderer, having "fallen from his pocket while he had been struggling with the woman". Even though there was no witness who had actually seen the accused enter the Wiseman home, Book said the Crown would detail "a remarkable chain of circumstances" that would prove that Green was the murderer.

Green gave evidence on the fourth day of the trial. During his period on the stand he was handed the bicycle pump found at Glenroy, and denied it was the one from the bicycle he had ridden. Green was then handed a second pump, which was found at Heidelberg and handed to police in December 1938. He claimed this pump was "exactly the same as the one which had disappeared from his bicycle". At the request of his defence barrister Green walked to the front of the jury box and attempted to fit the second pump onto the bicycle, however it did not fit the lugs and fell off in his hands. Green responded by saying, "It seems to me that the clip has been knocked down".

On the final day of the trial, 25 February 1939, the defence barrister, Leo Little, in his final address, "impressed upon the jury the necessity for regarding with caution the circumstantial evidence relied upon by the Crown". He pointed to the absence of any fingerprint evidence and claimed the prosecution had failed to prove Green was within eight miles of the Wiseman home on the night of the murders. The jury retired mid-afternoon and returned to the court after five and three-quarter hours to return guilty verdicts on both counts of murder. When he was asked by the judge's associate if he had anything to say before sentence was passed upon him, Green replied, "No, nothing". The prisoner was sentenced to death by Justice Lowe. It was reported that several women in the court began to weep when the sentence was being pronounced. Among them was Isabella Aitken, in whose household Green was living at the time of the murders. Aitken "was borne out of court weeping disconsolately".

On March 4 an appeal against his conviction and sentence of death for the Glenroy murders was lodged on Green's behalf by his solicitor. On 10 March 1939, after a two-day hearing, the Court of Criminal Appeal dismissed George Green's appeal. The Court was made up of the Chief Justice, Sir Frederick Mann, Justice Gavan Duffy and Justice Martin. The decision to dismiss the appeal was a majority one, with the Chief Justice dissenting. The judges differed in their views of the importance of the finding of a second bicycle pump at Heidelberg, as it related to justification for a new trial. Green's instructing solicitor, Joseph Barnett, indicated that the High Court of Australia would be asked for special leave to appeal against the decision.

On Wednesday, 22 March 1939, the Full Bench of the High Court unanimously dismissed an application by Green for special leave to appeal against his conviction and sentence of death. In summing up the Chief Justice, Sir John Latham, said that in his opinion "the evidence now relied upon was fully available to the accused at the time of the trial". He added, "Further, if the evidence were given and believed, it would not have been decisive".

=== Execution ===
George Green was hanged on the morning of 17 April 1939 at Pentridge Prison, Coburg. Before being taken from his cell to the scaffold, he was asked by the Sheriff if he had anything to say before he died. Green said he had heard that a newspaper claimed he had confessed to the crimes, but he wished to say he had made no confession of guilt. Green was buried in the grounds of Pentridge Prison.

== Victims ==
- Phyllis Vivien Wiseman – born on 24 May 1921 in Glenroy, Victoria, the daughter of Arthur Ernest Wiseman (brother of Annie C. Wiseman) and Alice (née Wiseman); her father was a solicitor who practised law in Melbourne, later giving up his practise to devote himself to pastoral interests; he farmed at Glenroy before transferring his interests to Gippsland; in about 1936 the family relocated to Trafalgar in West Gippsland; while the family were living in Glenroy Phyllis was educated at the Lowther Hall Anglican Girls’ Grammar School at Essendon; in about mid-1938 Phyllis came to Melbourne where she was employed as a typist at the Kodak works at Abbotsford; she usually stayed with her unmarried aunt, Miss Annie Wiseman, from Thursday night to Sunday night, and the remainder of the week with her aunt and uncle, Laura and Rowland Barrett, in nearby Pascoe Vale Road; her father died suddenly at Trafalgar in September 1938; Phyllis Wiseman was murdered by Green at the home of her aunt, Annie Wiseman, on the night of 12 November 1938, aged 17 years.
- Annie Constance Wiseman – born on 4 July 1875 in the inner Melbourne suburb of Hawthorn, Victoria, the youngest daughter of Albert Wiseman and Hannah (née Parker); lived in the house in Melbourne Avenue, Glenroy, since about 1918; Miss Wiseman owned "several properties in the district" and "had the reputation in the neighbourhood of being a rich woman"; she was "respected throughout the district, and was well known for her ardent work for the Church of England"; Annie Wiseman was murdered by Green at her home on the night of 12 November 1938, aged 63 years.
