= Alfred Bye =

Australian murderer

- Born: 25 April 1899
- Died: 22 December 1941 (aged 42); HM Prison Pentridge, Victoria, Australia
- Occupation: Transport driver
- Status: Executed by hanging
- Conviction: Murder
- Penalty: Death

Alfred Bye (25 April 1899 – 22 December 1941), was convicted of a stabbing murder behind Parliament House, Melbourne, Victoria. He was executed at Pentridge Prison, Victoria in 1941. Bye was the sixth of eleven people to be hanged at Pentridge Prison after the closure of Melbourne Gaol in 1924.

== Murder ==
Alfred Bye was a small man with a slim build who had enlisted into the Australian army and was employed as a transport driver at the army depot in Darley near Bacchus Marsh. In 1930, he was once engaged to Amelia Ogier. Three years later, the engagement was called off and Ogier heard no more of Bye for another eight years. In the meantime, she became acquainted with Thomas Edward Walker, who was a soldier stationed at Broadmeadows and was separated from his wife and planning to divorce. The two decided to marry when Walker obtained a divorce.

In 1941, Bye wanted to rekindle his relationship with Ogier but she was not interested. To prove his love, he wanted to hand over his military wages to her. She rejected his offer but Bye was still insistent. Bye had visited her at her home but her boyfriend Walker had told him to go away.

On 27 September, Bye obtained leave from camp and took the train to Melbourne. Bye was armed with a knife which he had bought some weeks earlier. He knew that Ogier with Walker and her two nieces were going to the theatre, and he approached the group at Flinders Street station. He was wanting to speak to her when Walker approached and "put his hands up." He thought Walker was going to strike him so he "got in" first and struck Walker.

Two blocks North, at the corner of Swanston and Bourke streets he again approached Ogier and asked her to forgive him for a previous occurrence and shake hands. Shortly afterwards, Walker approached Bye and said, "I'll see you in half an hour." Later, Bye went to the corner of Bourke and Spring streets and saw Walker standing there. The two men walked into the Treasury Gardens and got into a fight. Walker was found with six stab wounds, five in the chest and one in the neck. After throwing the knife away, Bye returned to Bacchus Marsh by the 11.25 train that night.

== Trial and execution ==
The trial was held in the Melbourne Supreme Court. The jury took forty-five minutes to deliver a guilty verdict. Judge Charles Leonard Gavan Duffy sentenced him to death for the murder. When asked by the judge if the condemned man had anything to say, Bye replied, "I never intended to murder him. I had to do something to defend myself. When he had me by the throat I had to make him release his grip."

Bye was hanged and buried at Pentridge Prison, Coburg, on 22 December 1941. Bye was a nervous wreck leading up to the execution and, as he was unable to stand, he was strapped to a chair instead.
