= Newlands Road Bridge =

Heritage-listed bridge over the Merri Creek in Melbourne, Victoria, Australia

- Coordinates: 37°44′06″S 144°58′20″E
- Carries: Newlands Road: motor vehicles (1865–1961); pedestrians (since 1961)
- Crosses: Merri Creek; Merri Creek Trail
- Locale: Melbourne, Victoria, Australia
- Begins: Newlands Road, Coburg (south)
- Ends: Newlands Road, Coburg North (north)
- Preceded by: Carr Street Bridge
- Followed by: Murray Road Bridge

Characteristics
- Design: Arch bridge
- Material: Bluestone
- Total length: 27.4 m (90 ft)
- Longest span: 9.1 m (30 ft)
- No. of spans: 3

History
- Architect: William Champ
- Constructed by: Pentridge Stockade convicts
- Built: 1865
- Opened: 1865; 161 years ago

Victorian Heritage Register
- Official name: Bridge over Merri Creek, Newlands Road
- Type: Registered place
- Designated: 20 August 1982
- Reference no.: H1446
- Heritage overlay no.: HO125
- Category: Transport - Road

Location
- Interactive map of Newlands Road Bridge

The Newlands Road Bridge, also known as the Merri Creek Bridge, is a triple-span arch stone former road bridge, now pedestrian bridge, across the Merri Creek and its associated trail, constructed by Victorian convicts, that initially carried Newlands Road vehicular traffic — now pedestrian traffic — located between Coburg and Coburg North, inner northern suburbs of Melbourne, in Victoria, Australia.

Built in 1865, the bridge was added to the Victorian Heritage Register on 20 August 1982 in recognition of its historical, social and architectural importance.

== History ==
The Newlands Road Bridge was built by Pentridge Stockade convict labour under the administration of William Champ, the third inspector General of Penal Establishments in Victoria who had earlier been the first Premier of Tasmania. Chubb's name is inscribed on a foundation stone of the bridge. The bluestone for the bridge was quarried from within the Old Penal Reserve along the Merri Creek.

== Description ==
Newlands Road Bridge was originally built as a road bridge and was open to traffic up until 1961 when a new concrete bridge was opened along side it. Newlands Road Bridge is a triple span bluestone segmental arched bridge with integral balustrades and parapets. Each span is 9.1 metres (30 ft) and the bridge is 27.4 metres (90 ft) long, in total. It is currently used as a pedestrian bridge across the Merri Creek. The bridge runs in a north-south direction and follows the course of an old section of Newlands Road.

The bridge is architecturally and scientifically significant as an early example of a substantial bluestone bridge. It demonstrates skilled stonemasonry in its construction with prominent voussoirs to the arches, substantial piers with carved breakwaters, rusticated bluestone string course at road level, and capping stones to the parapet walls. The bridge is important for its contribution to the complex of visually linked prison related structures, which include the Murray Road Bridge and the walls of HM Prison Pentridge.

== See also ==
- List of bridges in Melbourne
- List of places on the Victorian Heritage Register in the City of Merri-bek
