= HM Prison Pentridge =

Prison in Victoria, Australia

HM Prison Pentridge (former)
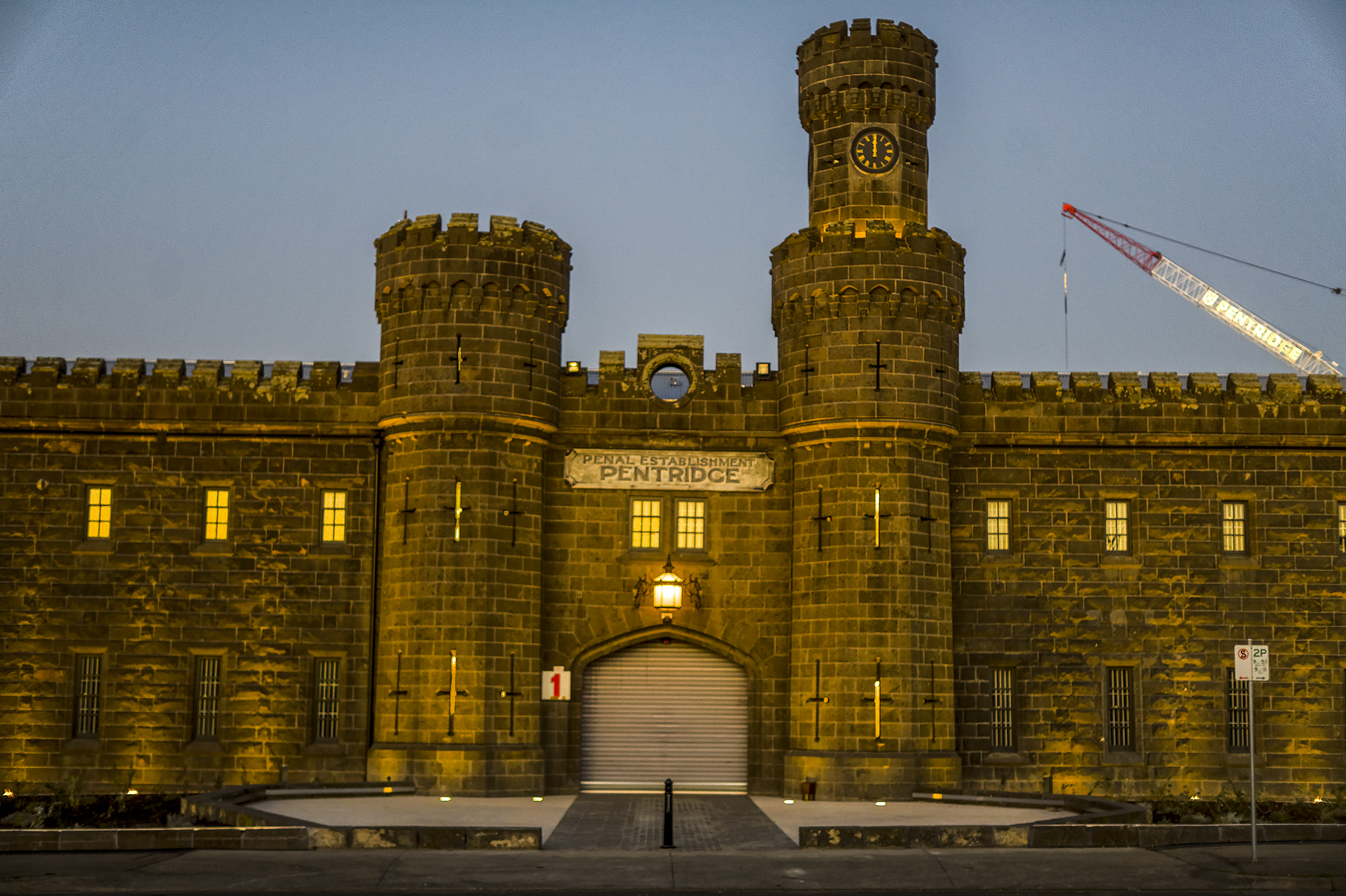
- The gates of the former prison in 2020

- Location of the former prison in Greater Metopolitan Melbourne
- Interactive map of HM Prison Pentridge (former)
- Location: Coburg, Melbourne, Victoria, Australia; 37°44′21″S 144°58′9″E
- Status: Closed; Partially redeveloped as housing, retail, public open space, and heritage tourism, since 2013
- Security class: Maximum security (Note: Downgraded to medium security from April 1995 until its closure.); Remand inmates (D Division)
- Opened: 1851; 175 years ago
- Closed: 1 May 1997; 29 years ago
- Former name: Pentridge Stockade (1850-1859); Pentridge Penal Establishment (1859-1932); His Majesty's Gaol Pentridge (1932-1959); Her Majesty's Gaol Pentridge (1959-1972); Her Majesty's Prison Pentridge (1972-1997)
- Managed by: Corrections Victoria (1851–1997)
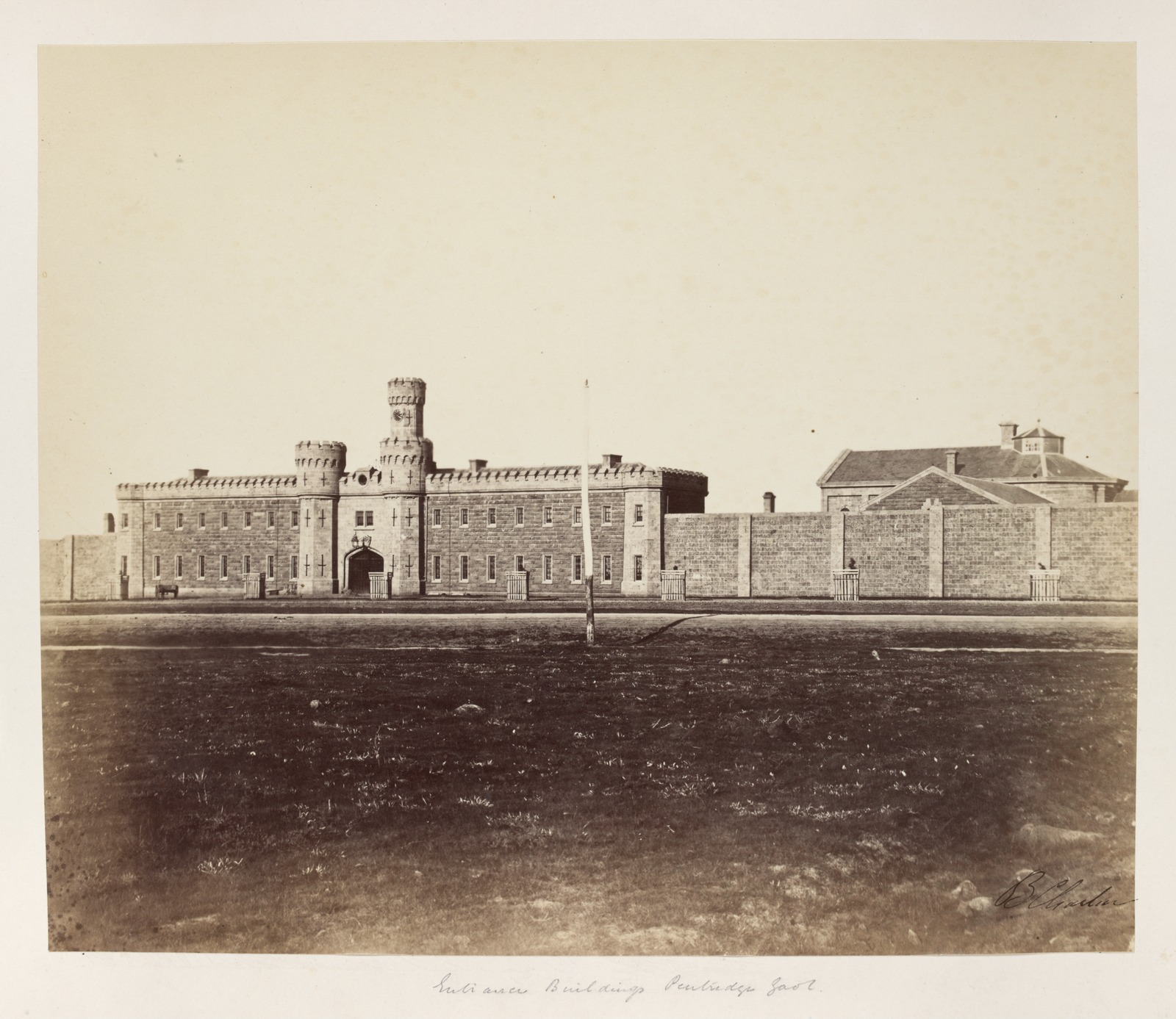
- The entrance to Pentridge Prison, 1861 (Source: State Library of Victoria)

Site notes
- Material: Bluestone; bricks; concrete
- Area: 57 ha (140 acres) (HM Pentridge and HM Metropolitan)
- Architects: William Champ; Gustav Joachimi (Public Works Department)
- Architectural style: Victorian
- Excavation dates: 2014: Panopticons (A & B divisions)
- Owner: Victorian Government (1851–1999)
- Management: National Trust of Australia (Victoria) (since 2023, as a tourism site)

Victorian Heritage Register
- Official name: HM Prison Pentridge
- Type: Registered place; Registered archaeological place
- Designated: 20 August 1982
- Reference no.: H1551
- Heritage overlay no.: HO47
- Categories: Cemeteries and Burial Sites; Law Enforcement

Register of the National Estate
- Official name: Pentridge Gaol Entrance Gates Building; Pentridge Prison
- Type: Defunct register
- Designated: 21 March 1978
- Reference no.: 5582; 18351

HM Prison Pentridge, (Note: HM is an abbreviation of His or Her Majesty, referring to the reigning monarch during at the time of the prison's operation, since 1932.) better known as the Pentridge Prison and officially, Her Majesty's Prison Pentridge, is a former prison in Coburg, an inner northern suburb of Melbourne, in Victoria, Australia. The first convicts arrived at the gaol in 1851 and the facility closed during 1997, and some of the heritage-listed buildings are extant. Pentridge was colloquially referred to as the "Bluestone College", "Coburg College" or "College of Knowledge".

The site is archeologically significant as it contains remnants of 1850s-era prison structures, the burial sites of all executed prisoners relocated from the Old Melbourne Gaol between 1929 and 1937, and the burials of nine prisoners executed at Pentridge between 1928 and 1951, including the former grave of Ned Kelly, a Colonial Australian bushranger.

In 1999, the Victorian Government sold the site to property developers and, since 2013, guided by various masterplans, heritage impact statements, and development consents, the heritage-listed buildings were required to be restored and integrated into a new community precinct with a mix of housing types, retail, commercial, public open space, and heritage-aligned tourism facilities. Buildings that were not included in the heritage curtail were demolished.

== Location ==
The former prison is located on the traditional lands of the Wurundjeri Woi-wurrung.

During its operations, known as the Coburg Prisons Complex, the 57-hectare (140-acre) site at Coburg was located to the west of Merri Creek and generally consisted of two distinct precincts: to the north was the historical HM Pentridge Prison, and to the south was HM Metropolitan Prison. The complex was bounded by Champ Street, Murray Road, and Urquart Street. Pentridge Boulevard, Wardens Walk, Sentry Lane, Industry Lane, Stockade Avenue, and Via Roma were all internal roads within the prison complex.

Churches, Council offices, and schools were all located within 500 metres (1,600 ft) of some of Victoria's most hardened criminals. A local historian opined:

"Pentridge dominated the suburban neighbourhood surrounding it, both physically and psychologically, a massive shape, without adjacent trees to soften its high walls … Its bluestone construction was dark and alien … and the gothic allusions of its main gate and towers made it all the more forbidding."

— in Coburg: Between Two Creeks, 2002.

== Heritage listing ==
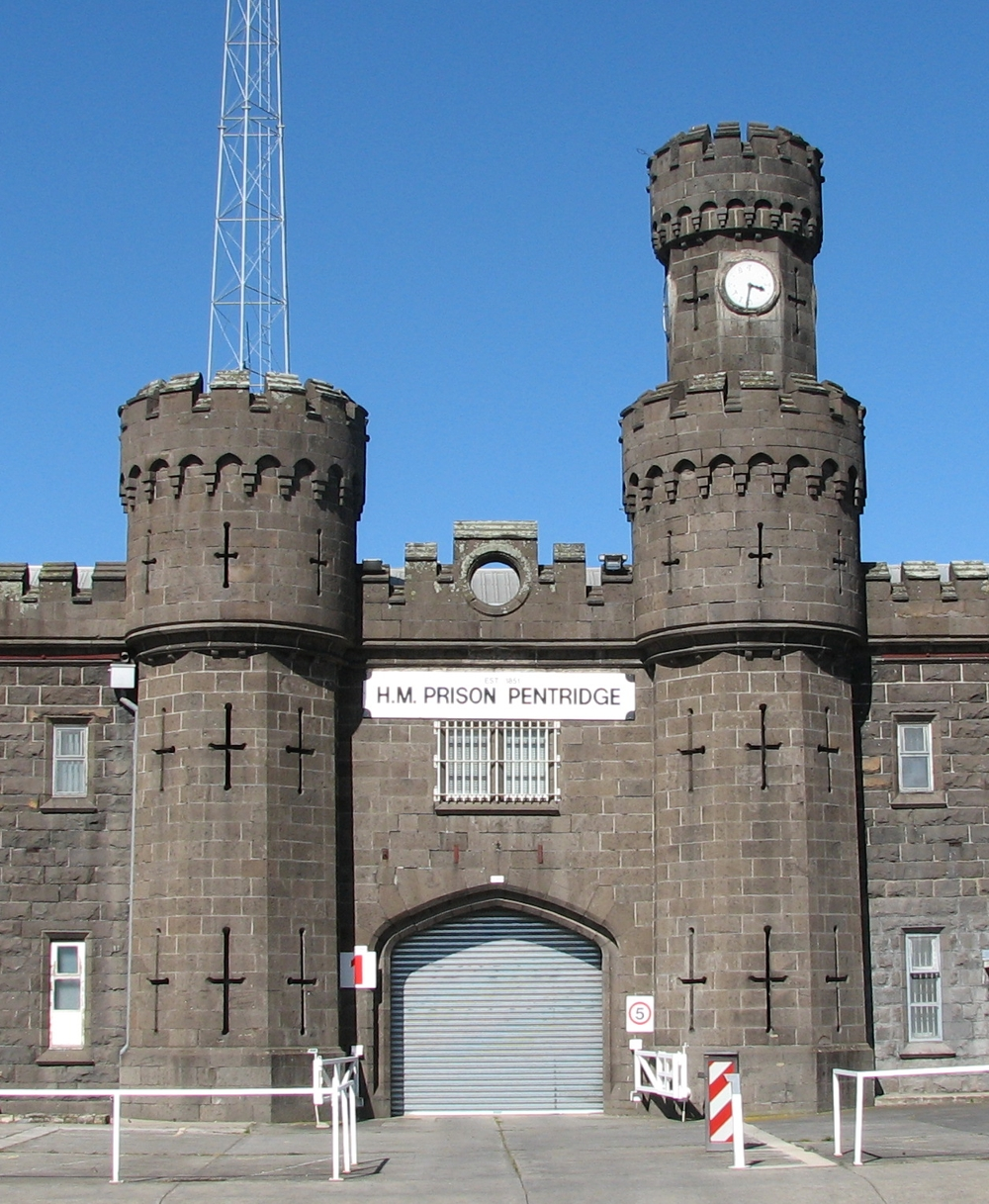
Pentridge Prison front gate, 2006

Parts of the former prison site of approximately 8 hectares (20 acres), whilst still in operation as a prison, were added to the Victorian Heritage Register on 20 August 1992 in recognition of the prison's historical, architectural, archaeological, scientific (technological) and aesthetic significance. The site was nominated for inclusion in the Australian National Heritage List; however, due to its closure and divestment, it did not meet the criteria and its nomination was withdrawn.

Parts of the former prison site were also added to non-statutory lists by the Victorian branch of the National Trust on 4 May 1998 and the City of Merri-bek on an unknown date. The site was identified, but not listed on the now defunct Register of the National Estate on unknown date, and the distinctive castellated entrance gates, with clock tower, designed by Gustav Joachimi of the Victorian Public Works Department, were listed on the now defunct register on 21 March 1978.

The heritage buildings and landmarks of significance include A, B, D, E and H Divisions, B Annexe, Pentridge's iconic entrance, the administration building, the guard towers and observation posts, and the wall surrounding the site. These structures were retained and, as of April 2015, restoration work commenced or planned to ensure their stability and preservation.

== Divisions ==
The Pentridge prison was split into divisions, named using letters of the alphabet:

Division	Use	Est.	Closed	Notes
A	Short- and long-term prisoners of good behaviour; built initially to house female prisoners, 1860–1865. During the late 1980s, until its closure it became a scene of many monthly bashings, stabbings and bludgeonings.	1860	1997	
B	Long-term prisoners of poor behaviour; initially called A Division, renamed in 1887; two-storey-bluestone structure with basement; could accommodate 176 cells; held a small number of women, 1956–1987	1859	1997	
C	Vagabonds and short-term prisoners, where infamous bushranger Ned Kelly was imprisoned; initially called B Division, renamed c. 1890; two-storey bluestone structure, expanded in 1879; could accommodate 360 prisoners	1858	1974	Demolished, 1974–1977
D	Remand prisoners, as HM Metropolitan Prison; built to initially house female prisoners, 1887–1894; three-storey bluestone structure	1887	1997	
E	Hospital, 1859–1959; repurposed a dormitory for short-term prisoners	1859	1997	Repurposed for dining and craft brewing
F	Remand and short-term prisoners; housed male juveniles, 1873–1879; transformed as the Metropolitan Remand and Assessment Centre; site of eleven executions by hanging	c. 1850s	1997	
G	Psychiatric division; built to initially house female juveniles, 1875–1893; (Note: A female prison was built within the outer walls of Pentridge, known as the Female Prison, Pentridge, operated between 1894 and 1932. Female prisoners were held in the Female Division within Pentridge, under the charge of a Matron, until 1956, with some women held in B Division and its annex until 1987.) then as a general hospital for inmates, 1959–1980	1875	1997	
H	High security, discipline and protection	1958	1994	
J	Young offenders initially aged 18 to 21 years; subsequently used for long-term prisoners with a record of good behaviour	1960s	1997	Demolished, 2013
K	Initially called Jika Jika, the maximum-security risk and protection division	1980	1987	

== History of prison structures ==
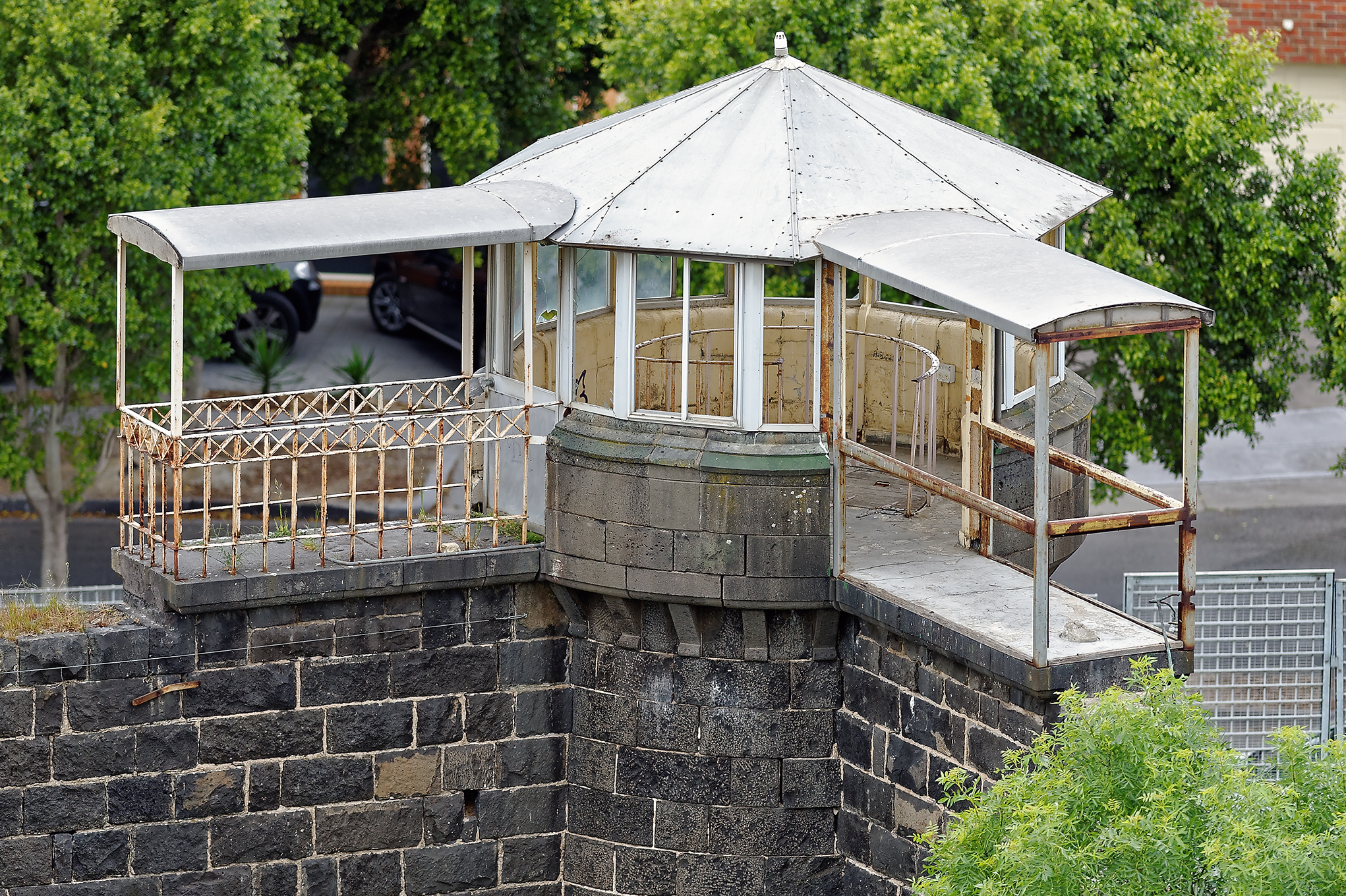
HM Prison Pentridge guard tower, 2014

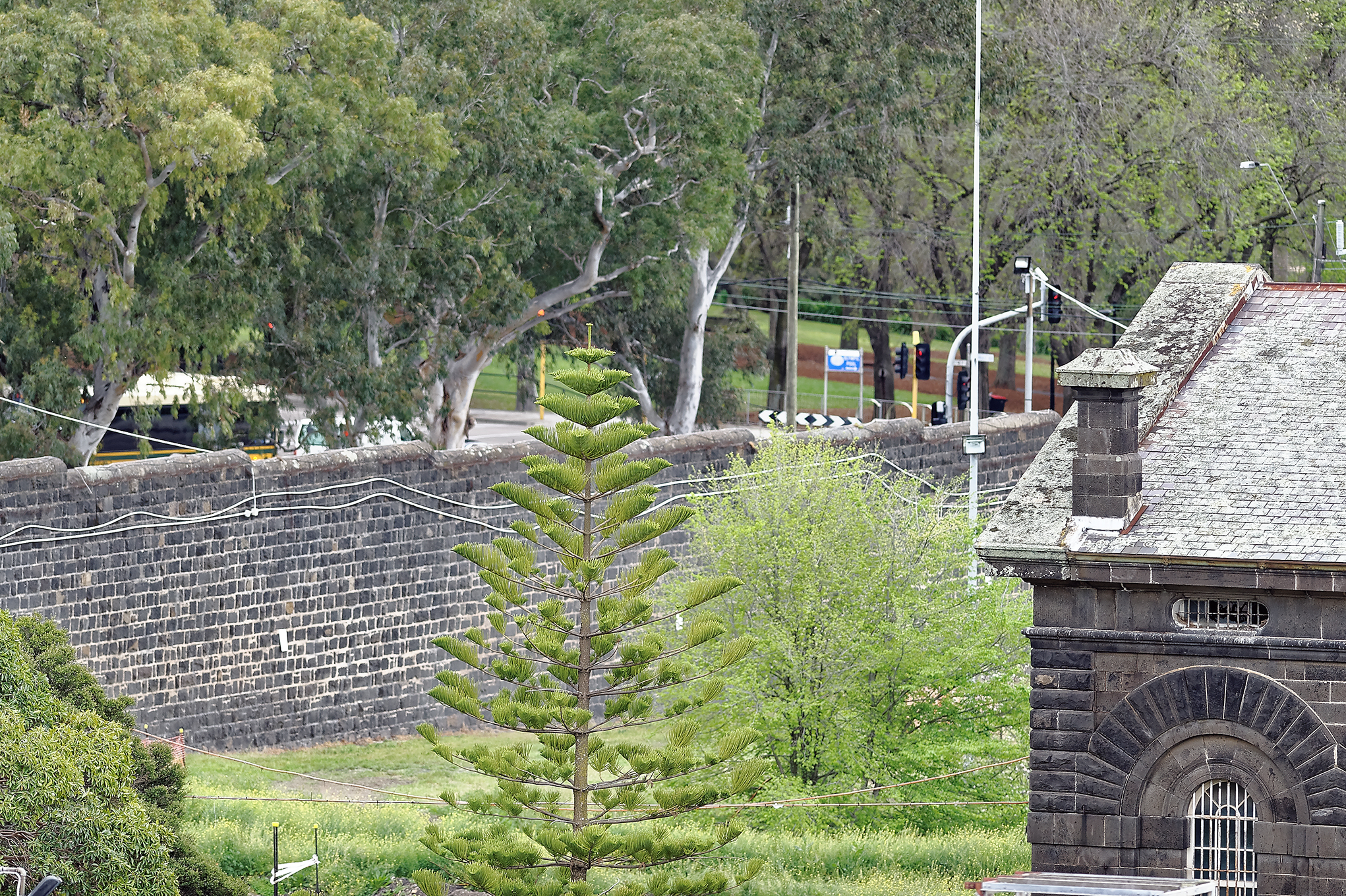
Pentridge Prison A Division front garden, 2014

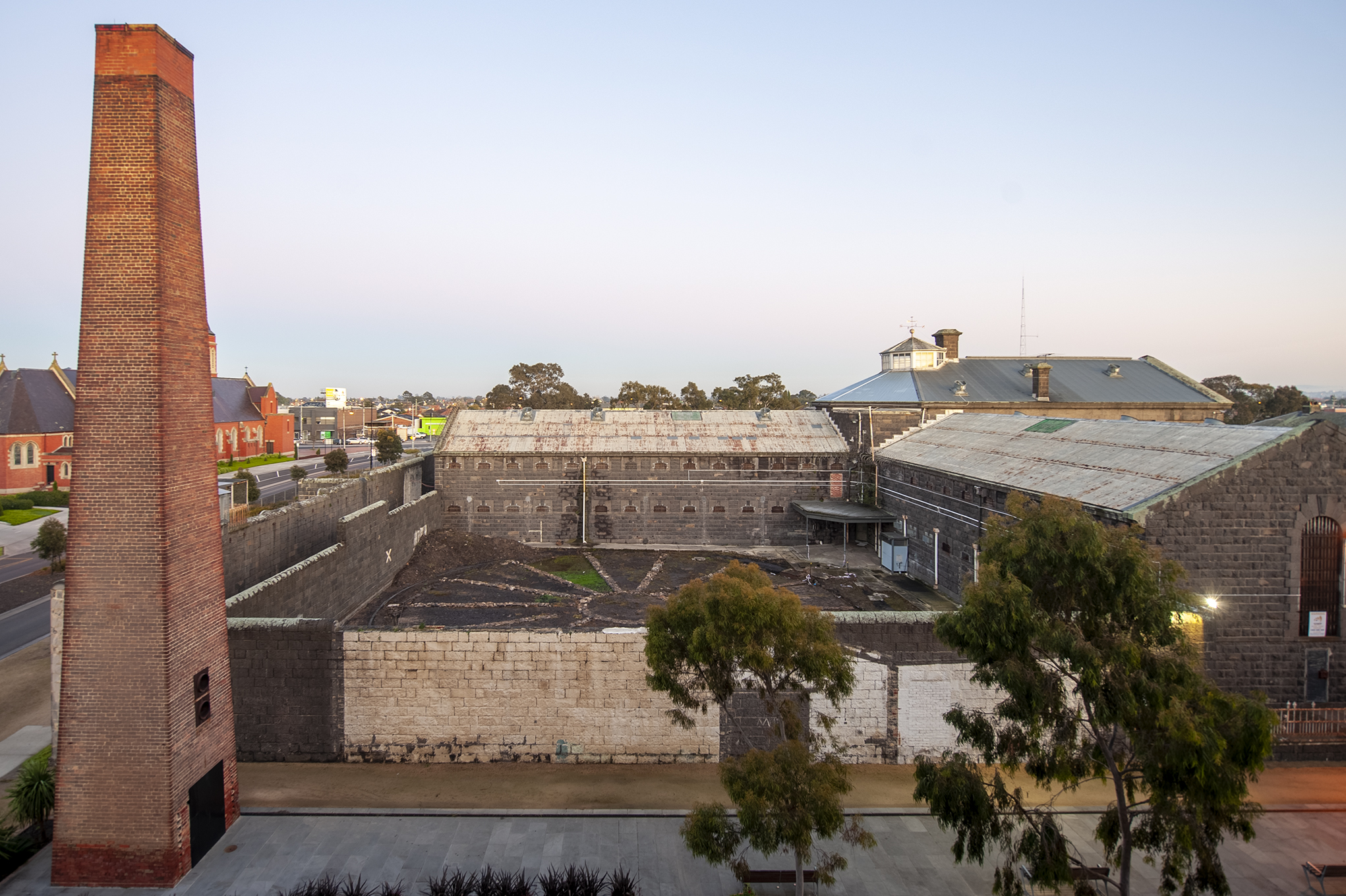
HM Prison Pentridge shot tower, 2015

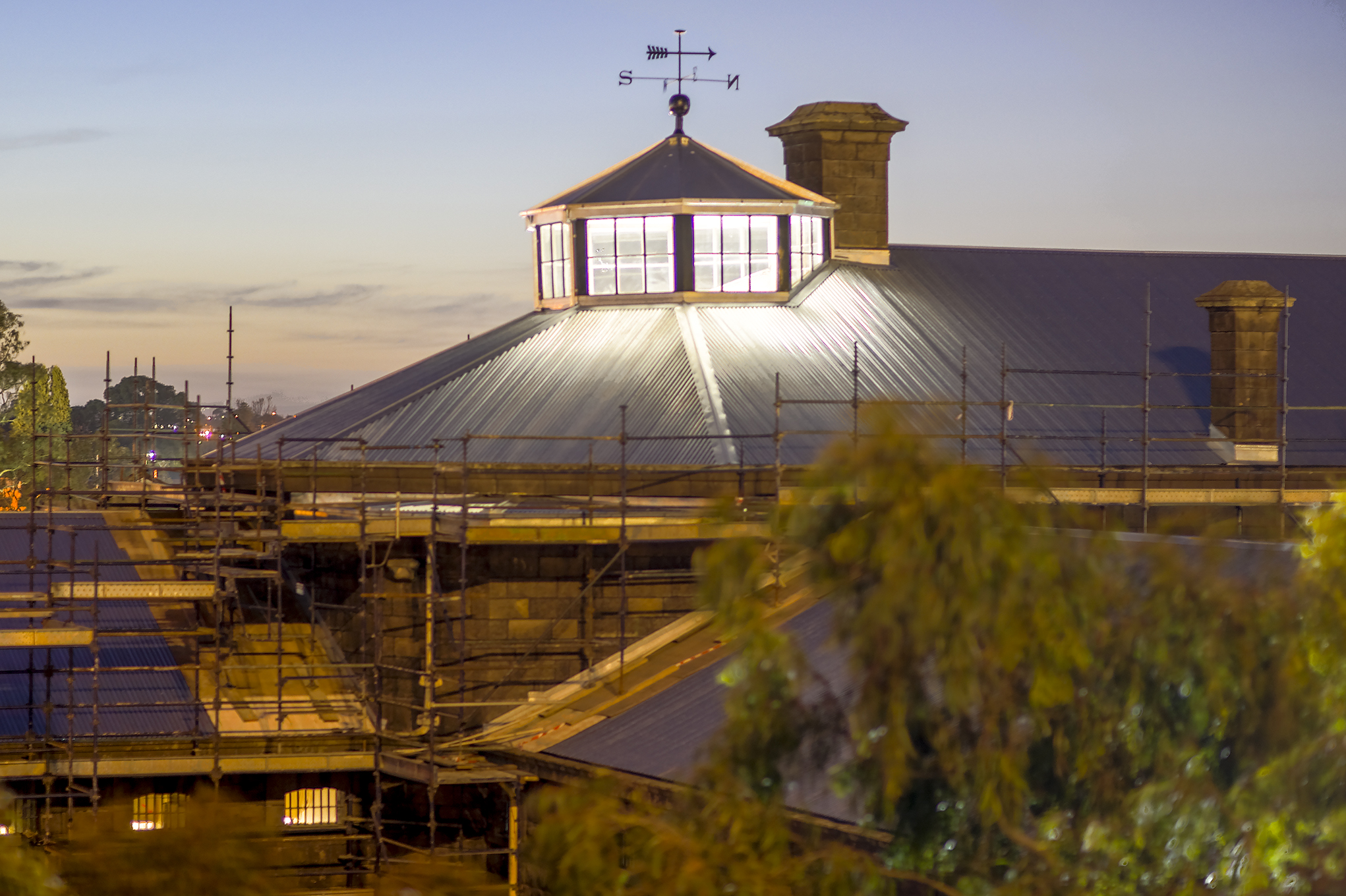
Pentridge Prison B Division turret, 2020

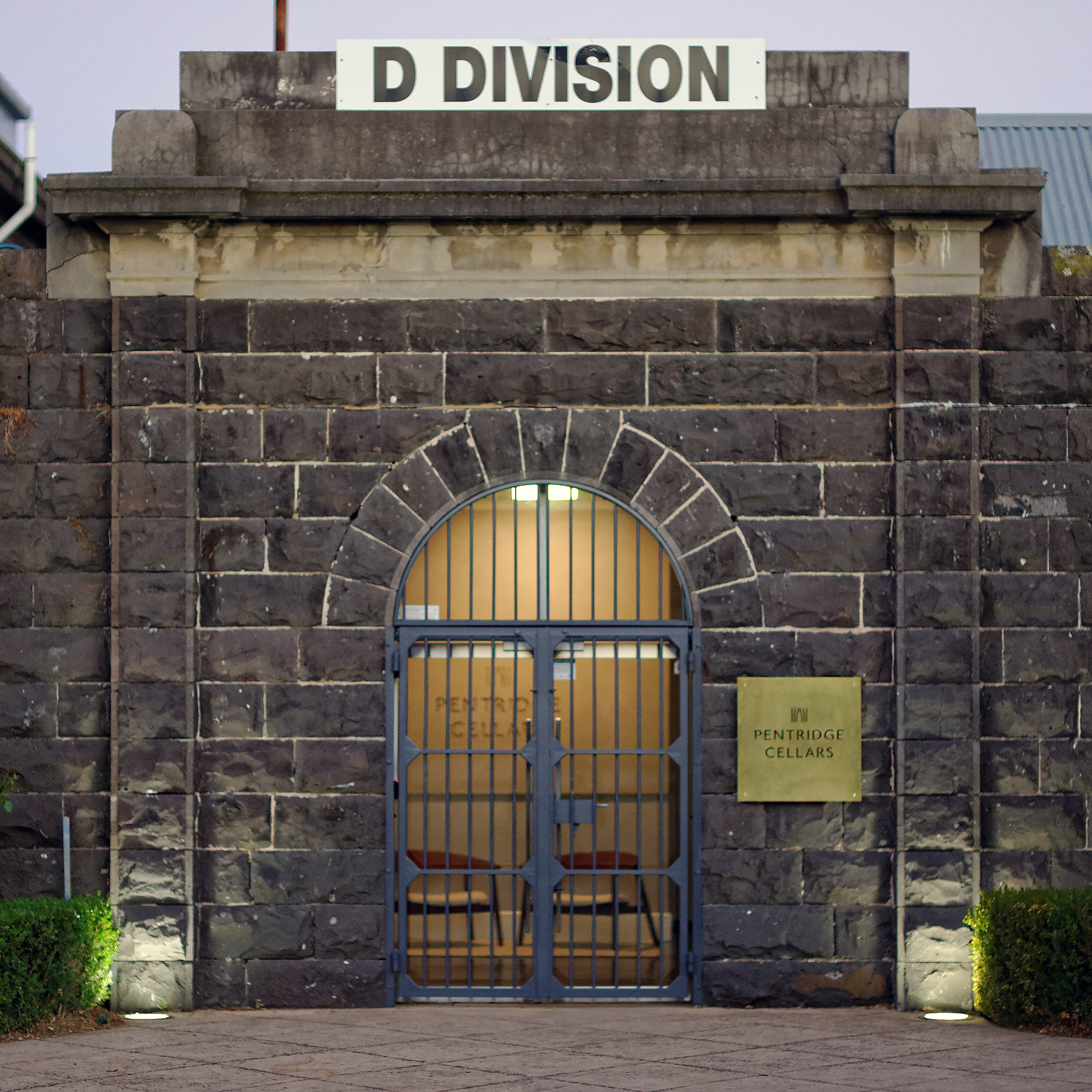
Pentridge Prison D Division entrance, 2020

In 1851, an ad hoc group of structures was built by prison labour using local materials and the first prison structures were established. None of these structures survived, other than the boundaries of the prison that were established. The second phase of construction, undertaken in the late 1850s and early 1860s, was made under the direction of Inspector General William Champ, based on British and American precedents. The grounds were originally landscaped by landscape gardener Hugh Linaker.

Pentridge was the location of reformatories for both males and females, including juveniles, established following the findings of the Victorian royal commission on penal and prison discipline of 1870–1872. A female prison was constructed on the site between 1860 and 1865, subsequently known as A Division; a new female prison was constructed between 1887 and 1894, subsequently known as D Division; and a purpose-built reformatory for juvenile girls operated between 1875 and 1893, subsequently known as G Division. When HM Prison Fairlea was established as Victoria's main female prison in 1956, Pentridge predominately housed male prisoners only; with a small number of women accommodated in the Annex to B Division until 1987. A reformatory for juvenile boys was accommodated in F Division, between 1875 and 1879. Both the girls' and boys' reformatories were called Jika.

In 1900, labour yards for A Division were completed. During the 1950s these yards were later converted to a high security block which became known as H Division.

In 1924, the Melbourne Gaol was closed and its prisoners were relocated to Pentridge as it became the main remand and reception prison for the Melbourne metropolitan area. In 1958, H Division was opened as a high security, discipline and protection unit.

=== Jika Jika high-security unit (K Division) ===
Jika Jika, opened in 1980 at a cost of A$7 million, was a 'gaol within a gaol' maximum-security section, designed to house Victoria's hardest and longest-serving prisoners. It was awarded the 'Excellence in Concrete Award' by the Concrete Institute of Australia. The design of Jika Jika was based on the idea of six separate units at the end of radiating spines. The unit comprised electronic doors, closed-circuit TV and remote locking, designed to keep staff costs to a minimum and security to a maximum. The furnishings were sparse and prisoners exercised in aviary-like escape-proof yards.

In 1983 four prisoners escaped from 'escape-proof' Jika Jika. When two prison officers were disciplined in relation to the Jika Jika escape, a week-long strike occurred.

==== 1987 fire ====
In 1987, inmates Robert Wright, Jimmy Loughnan, Arthur Gallagher, David McGauley and Ricky Morris from one side of the unit, and convicted Russell Street bomber Craig Minogue and three other inmates on the other side, sealed off their section doors with a tennis net. Mattresses and other bedding were then stacked against the doors and set on fire. Wright, Loughnan, Gallagher, McGauley and Morris died in the blaze. Minogue and the three others were evacuated and survived. Jika Jika was closed the following year amidst controversy after the escapes, fire, and resultant inmate deaths.

=== Winding down and closure ===
In 1994, the infamous H-Division was closed and prisoners were transferred to the new maximum security facility, HM Prison Barwon. The Victorian Government confirmed its intention to close Pentridge and replace it with two new male prisons, each accommodating around 600 prisoners, in December 1993. In April 1995, the Office of Corrections ordered that the six main towers at Pentridge be closed, since most of the high-security prisoners from the gaol had been relocated to Barwon, HM Prison Loddon, and private prisons in Sale and Laverton, as part of the downgrading of Pentridge to a medium-security prison. HM Pentridge Prison was closed on 1 May 1997, the adjacent HM Metropolitan Prison was closed on 25 November 1997, and both sites were subsequently sold by the Victorian Government.

=== Panopticons ===
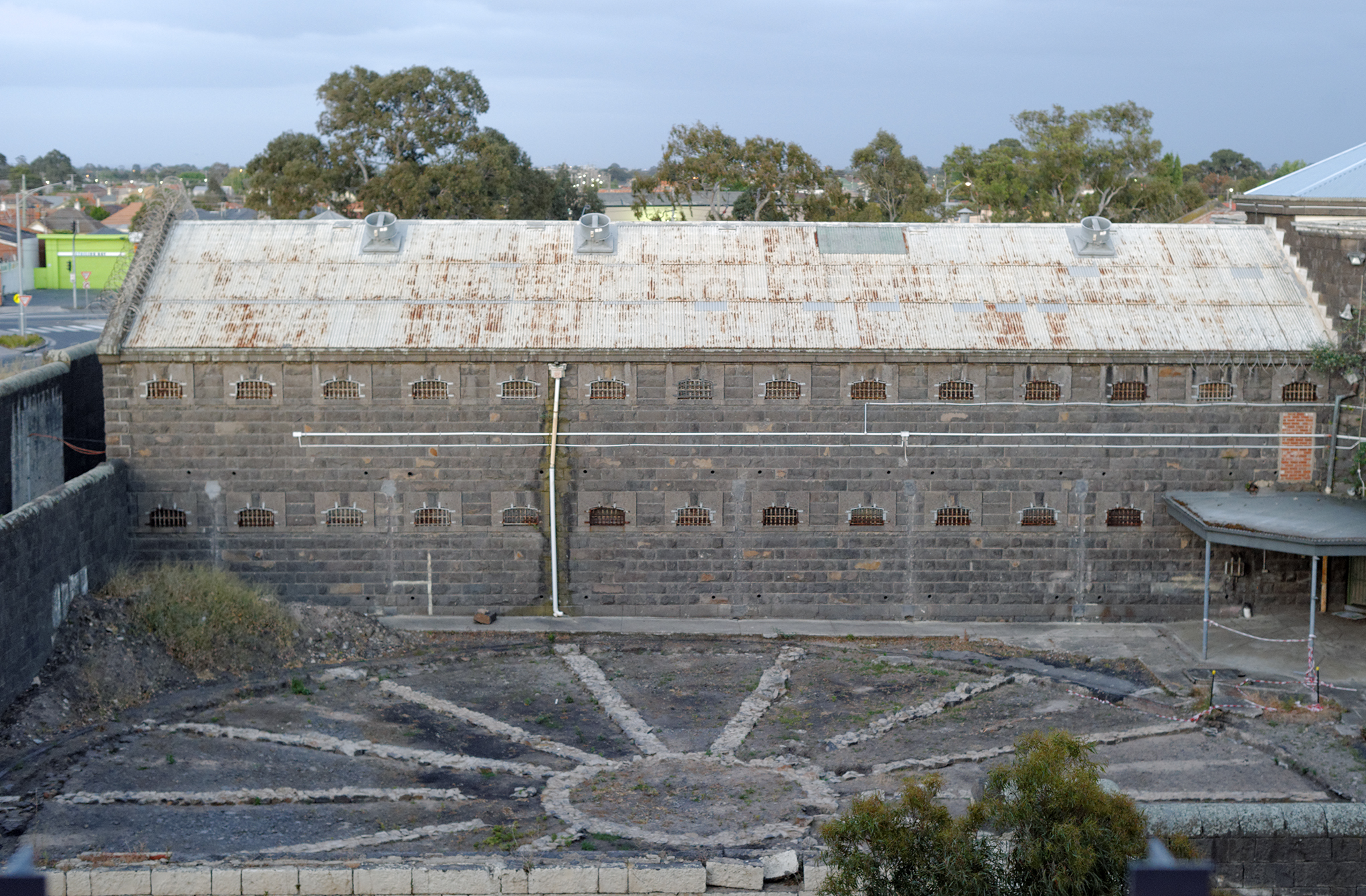
Pentridge Prison panopticon ruin, 2015

Following its closure and during conservation work in 2014, archaeologists discovered three rare panopticons (Note: Named after the 1791 prison design of British philosopher and social reformer Jeremy Bentham.) in the former prison grounds, located near the A and B Division buildings. Built of bluestone in the 1850s, the first panopticon uncovered and excavated was to the north of A Division and was relatively intact. The circular design, with walls coming out from the centre, created wedge shaped 'airing yards' where prisoners would be permitted daily access for an hour, without coming into contact with other prisoners. The panopticons fell out of use, due to prison overcrowding, and were largely demolished in the early 1900s. The excavation and uncovering of the other two panopticons next to B Division revealed the remains of its rubble footings only.

== Inmate history ==
=== Grave sites ===
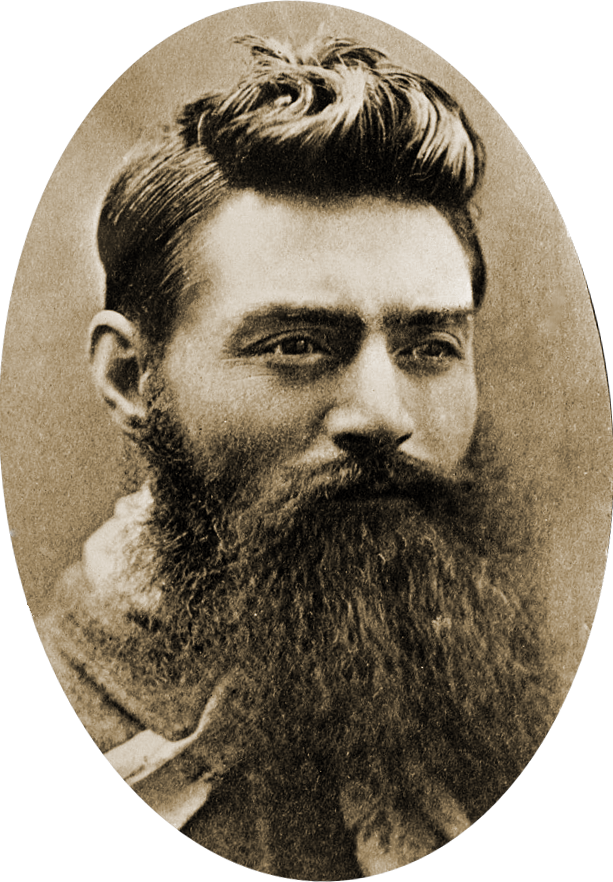
Ned Kelly the day before his execution by hanging. He was buried at Pentridge Prison.

The grave site of bushranger Ned Kelly formerly lay within the walls of Pentridge Prison. Ronald Ryan's remains have been returned to his family. Kelly was executed by hanging at the Melbourne Gaol in 1880 and his remains moved to Pentridge Prison in 1929, after his skeleton was disturbed in April 1929, by workmen constructing the present Royal Melbourne Institute of Technology (RMIT) building. Peter Norden, former prison chaplain at Pentridge Prison, has campaigned for the site's restoration.

As of 2011, most of the bodies have been exhumed by archaeologists and have either been re-interred in the original cemetery near D Division, are awaiting identification at the Melbourne morgue, or have been returned to their families.

In 2011, Ned Kelly's remains were again exhumed, and returned to his surviving descendants for a family burial. The identified remains of Kelly did not include most of his skull. DNA testing established that another complete skull believed to be Kelly's was not his.

=== Executions ===
Between 1842 and 1967, 186 prisoners were executed in Victoria, including ten at Pentridge. In 1951, Jean Lee was the last woman to be executed in Australia, who was hanged. After being convicted of killing prison officer George Hodson during an escape from Pentridge, at 8:00 am on 3 February 1967 Ronald Ryan became the last person to be executed at Pentridge and the last person executed in Australia. Ryan was hanged in D Division and his body was buried in an unmarked grave within the D Division prison facility.

Name	Date of execution	Notes
David Bennett	26 September 1932	Convicted of the sexual assault of a four-year-old girl; the last man executed in Australia for a crime other than murder
Arnold Karl Sodeman	1 June 1936	Strangled four girls over six years
Edward Cornelius	22 June 1936	Convicted of the murder of Rev. H. Laceby Cecil in December 1935 at Collingwood
Thomas William Johnson	23 January 1939	Convicted of two murders in October 1938 at a boarding-house in Dunolly
George Green	17 April 1939	Convicted of the murders of a woman and her niece at their home in the Melbourne suburb of Glenroy in November 1938
Alfred Bye	22 December 1941	Hanged sitting on a chair after nervous breakdown
Edward Joseph Leonski	9 November 1942	American soldier executed on behalf of the United States Army after general court-martial. Convicted of three counts of premeditated murder.
Jean Lee	19 February 1951	Last woman executed in Australia
Norman Andrews	19 February 1951	Accomplices of Jean Lee
Robert David Clayton	19 February 1951	Accomplices of Jean Lee
Ronald Joseph Ryan	3 February 1967	Last man executed in Australia

=== Notable prisoners ===
- Dennis Allen – oldest member of the Pettingill family
- Elliott Ronald Bull – Indigenous artist who painted murals on the walls of his cell which remain on site
- Jack Charles – Indigenous actor and community leader
- Garry David – (d. 1993), also known as Garry Webb, responsible for the Community Protection Act 1990
- John Dixon-Jenkins – aka anti-nuclear campaigner, imprisoned for planting fake bombs as part of a personal endeavour to raise public awareness about the global nuclear threat; authored The Unified Theory of Existence (A Love Story) while in Pentridge (1986)
- Peter Dupas – Australian serial killer
- Keith Faure – convicted of murdering Lewis Caine and Lewis Moran with Evangelos Goussis during the Melbourne gangland killings, and was also the basis for the character of Keithy George in the film Chopper
- Christopher Dale Flannery – (a.k.a. Mr Rent-a-Kill) hitman
- Kevin Albert Joiner – murderer, shot dead trying to escape in 1952
- Robert Wright – murderer, killed a mother and her nine-year-old son in 1979; involved in two escapes including the 1983 Jika Jika escape. Died in the 1987 Jika Jika prison fire
- Ned Kelly – murderer and bushranger
- Julian Knight – murdered 7 people in the Hoddle Street massacre
- Shelton Lea – poet
- Eddie Leonski – U.S. soldier, known as the Brownout Strangler
- Billy Longley – a former trade unionist
- James "Jimmy" Loughnan – an armed robber; broke both legs jumping from a Pentridge wall in an escape attempt in 1977. Died in the 1987 Jika Jika prison fire
- David McMillan – a drug smuggler
- Craig 'Slim' Minogue – the Russell Street bomber
- Ray Mooney – playwright, rapist
- Clarrie O'Shea – a trade unionist, arrested for contempt of court, triggering massive state-wide strike action
- Victor Peirce – a member of the Pettingill family, acquitted of the 1988 Walsh Street police shootings. Killed in 2002
- Harry Power – a bushranger
- Mark "Chopper" Read – a gang leader and standover man
- Gregory David Roberts – author of Shantaram, escapee of Pentridge who fled to India
- Ronald Ryan – the last person to be executed in Australia
- Frank Penhalluriack – imprisoned in the 1980s due to trading hours activism
- Maxwell Carl Skinner (a.k.a. Maxwell Karl Skinner) (1928–1998) – serial escapee, infamous for commandeering a Coburg tram in one of his escapes
- William Stanford – a sculptor
- Stan Taylor – an actor and Russell Street bomber
- Squizzy Taylor – a gangster
- Noel Tovey – Indigenous actor, choreographer and writer, imprisoned for homosexual acts in 1951 and raped by two prison guards
- John Zarb – the first person to be found guilty of having failed to comply with his call-up notice during the Vietnam War

=== Escapes ===
Year	Prisoner	Method	Outcome	Notes
1851	Frank Gardiner; sixteen others	Rushed troops on a work gang	Escaped to New South Wales	
1899	Pierre Douar	Picked the lock	Captured four days later; committed suicide once back at Pentridge	
1901	John Henry Sparks		Never heard of again	
1901	John O'Connor		Caught in Sydney 27 August 1901	
1926	J.K. Monson		In Western Australia	
1939	George Thomas Howard		Caught after two days	
1940	K.R. Jones		Caught in Sydney two weeks later	
1951	Victor Franz		Caught next day	
1952	Kevin Joiner		Shot dead escaping	
1952	Maxwell Skinner	Scaled the walls	Pushed off a wall and broke his leg	
1957	William John O'Meally; John Henry Taylor	Gained possession of an automatic handgun and ran through the main gates of the gaol, shooting a prison officer. They ran to a nearby filling station, stole a ute, before engaging in a gun battle with warders	Captured within 13 minutes after the bonnet of the getaway car flicked up and broke the windscreen, causing the car to crash into a hydrant	
1960	Ralph Wahle	Scaled the walls	Caught after 66 days, in Sydney, and incarcerated for offences in New South Wales; six months later, escaped again; captured three days later	
1961	Maurice Watson; Gordon Hutchinson	Climbed through the dormitory roof of F Division; scaled razor wire and walls	Both caught next day	
1965	Ronald Ryan; Peter Walker	Shot a prison guard whilst escaping	Caught in Sydney 19 days later; Ryan subsequently executed in Pentridge	
1972	Dennis Denehy; Gary Smedley; Alan Mansell; Henry Carlson	Sawed through window bars; scaled walls with knotted canvas ladder		
1973	Harold Peckman	Disguised wearing a beard, climbed on the roof; scaled walls using a rope	Caught next day	
1974	Edward "Jockey" Smith	After two days in custody, walked out wearing a visitor's pass	Captured three years later in Nowra after attempting to murder a police officer who had previously arrested him	
1974	Robert Hughes; George Carter			
1976	John Charles Walker			
1977	David Keys	Scaled the walls		
1977	Robert Wright	Hiding underneath rubbish in a garbage truck		
1977	James "Jimmy" Loughnan; three others	Climbed a rope that had been thrown over the wall	Loughnan broke both his ankles; a Catholic priest found him lying in his garden that night and took him to Ferntree Gully Hospital where he was identified and arrested	
1977	Peter James Dawson; three others			
1980	Gregory David Roberts (Note: Roberts was, at the time, known as Gregory (Doc) Smith.)	Scaled the walls in broad daylight	After a brief period in New Zealand, went to India for ten years; captured in Germany in 1990	
1980	Trevor Jolly	Scaled the walls in broad daylight		
1981	Peter Gibb		Captured after a month on the run. Discovered to have been staying in St Kilda with another escaped criminal	
1982	Harry Richard Nylander	Cut window bars; scaled the walls		
1983	Peter Kay Morgan; Trevor Charles Bradley; Ross Anthony Burleigh			
1983	David McGauley; Timothy Neville	Scaled the walls during a swimming contest between J Division and A Division	Captured after 18 days	
1983	Robert Wright; David McGauley; Timothy Neville; David Youlten	Escaped from Jika Jika		
1987	Dennis Mark Quinn	Cut window bars with a hack saw; scaled razor wire and walls; a getaway car was waiting	Recaptured in New Zealand 19 days later	
1992	Raymond Edmunds	Concealed in the back of a delivery van	Sniffer dogs found him at the gates	
1993	John Lindrea; one other	From H Division after breaking large bluestone rocks to a size of a thumbnail on a daily basis. Scaled the roof and jumped over the front wall where a getaway car was waiting	Caught several weeks later in New South Wales	
1993	Peter Gibb (Note: Both prisoners were in the Melbourne Remand Centre.); Archie Butterfly	Gibb was in a relationship with a prison guard, Heather Parker, who smuggled explosives into the prison. Gibb and Butterfly blew open the window to their cell. A getaway car was waiting for them. Gibb shot a police officer after the escape.	Gibb, Parker, and Butterfly were located three days later. Butterfly shot himself during a shootout. Gibb and Parker were taken into custody.	

== Usage in media ==
- The front gate showing the "HM Prison Pentridge" sign is featured on the cover of Australian band Airbourne's debut album Runnin' Wild.
- Episode 2, "Homecomings" of the 1976 ABC-TV adaptation of Frank Hardy's novel Power Without Glory, features John West picking his brother Frank West up from Pentridge Prison after serving 12 years for rape.
- The 1988 John Hillcoat and Evan English film Ghosts… of the Civil Dead was largely based on events which occurred in Pentridge Prison's infamous Jika Jika maximum-security prison during the lead-up to the 1987 fire.
- The 1994 Australian film Everynight ... Everynight details prison life inside Pentridge's H Division.
- The 2000 Andrew Dominik film Chopper was partially filmed in H Division.
- In the 1997 Australian film The Castle, Wayne was a prisoner of HM Prison Pentridge.
- Rupert Mann's 2017 photo essay, published by Scribe, Pentridge: Voices From The Other Side, contains interviews with, and portraits of, fifteen former inmates and staff who returned to the now-forgotten prison to tell its true and brutal story.
- Episodes 578 and 579 of Australian soap opera The Sullivans feature the prison.
- Pentridge Prison is depicted in the pilot episode of the TV series Shantaram.
- Pentridge Prison : inside out / photographic insights by Adrian Didlick; curated and edited by Katrin Strohl. Introduction and texts to the divisions written by Don Osborne, a former teacher at Pentridge and author of the book "Pentridge: Behind the Bluestone Walls".

== Redevelopment of the site ==
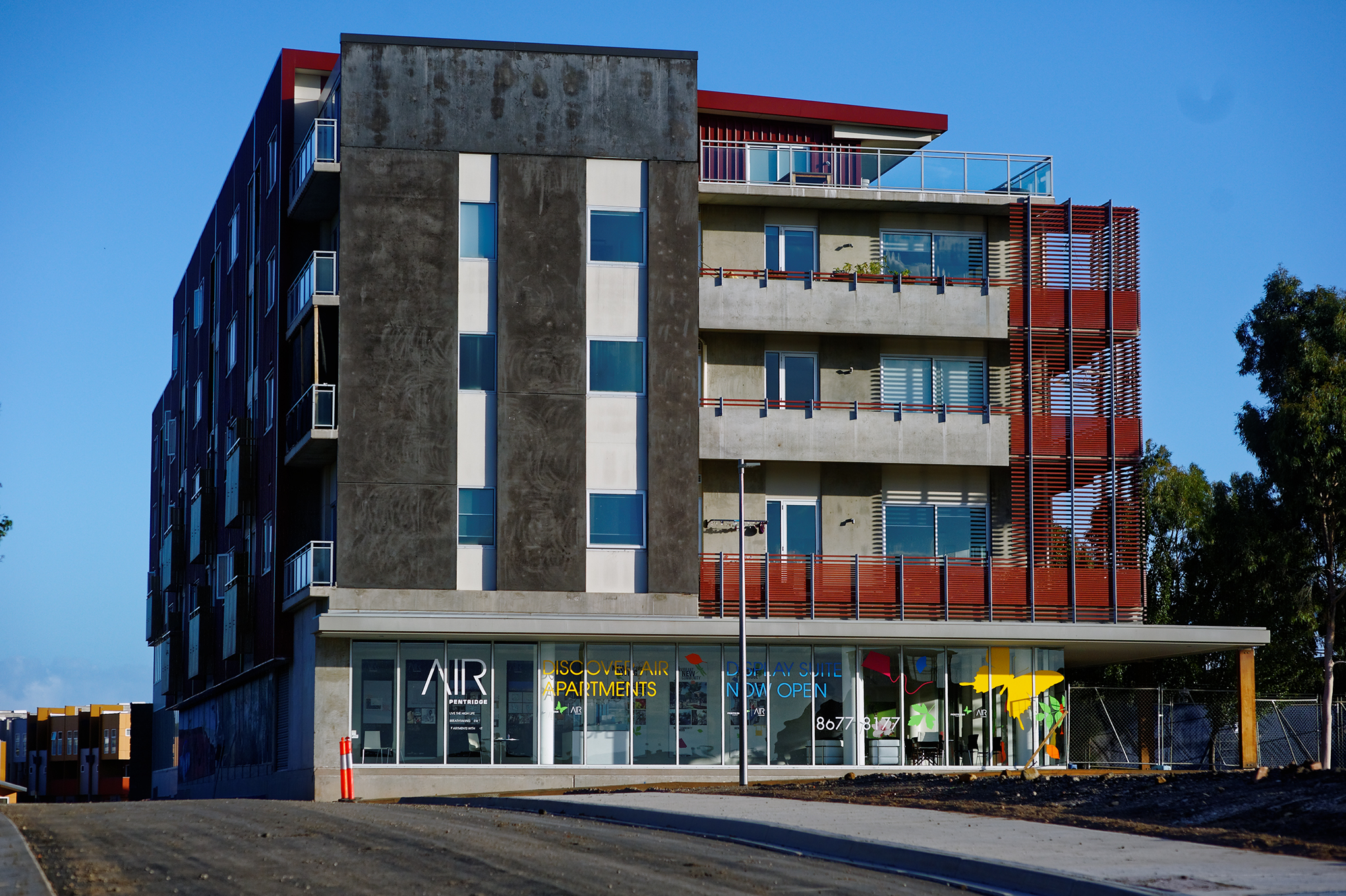
Pentridge Prison Quarter Masters Building, 2016

In 1999, the Victorian Government sold the entire 57-hectare (140-acre) former Coburg Prisons Complex site to property developers, Luciano Crema, Harry Barbon, and Peter and Leigh Chiavaroli. Guided by a site masterplan and development consents, the heritage-listed buildings were to be restored and integrated into a new community precinct a mix of housing types, retail, and public open space. (Note: See also, Moreland Planning Scheme, clause 12 of clause 37.08, Schedule 1 to the Activity Centre Zone.) In 2002, the entire site was divided into two parts:

Northern precinct — Pentridge Coburg

Also referred to as the "Pentridge Piazza" site, the precinct, acquired by Crema and Barbon, is bordered by Champ Street, Pentridge Boulevard, Murray Road and Stockade Avenue, and was essentially the site of the former HM Pentridge Prison. (Note: Identified as "Precinct 9" in the former Moreland Planning Scheme, clause 1.0 and 5.9 of clause 37.08, Schedule 1 to the Activity Centre Zone.) In 2007, Valad Property Group and Abadeen Group acquire the precinct, and, after approval of a 2009 masterplan, sell the precinct to the Shayher Group, part of the Taiwanese developer Par Jar Group, in 2013. Following approval of a 2014 revised masterplan, Shayher commences construction of the Horizon apartments at the north-east corner in 2015. As part of the heritage preservation requirements, restoration work commenced to restore the roof of A Division, and seven guard towers. The H Division's rock-breaking yards were demolished. In 2016, many part of the former prison are opened to the public as an Open Day, allowing the community to visit the site, and as the first residential development is completed, Shayher revealed plans for a new "urban village" including up to 20 new buildings with community spaces and landscaped gardens.

In 2019, the Heritage Council of Victoria upheld a decision by the Executive Director of Heritage Victoria to reject a development application by Shayher to construct a new single-storey 21.8 by 17 by 17.4 m (72 by 56 by 57 ft) trapezoid-shaped building in the Mustering Yard. The Council determined that the proposed building would have an unacceptable impact on the cultural heritage significance due to the impact on existing views to B Division. A shopping centre, cinema, a 19-storey residential tower, and 16-storey hotel —located in parts of the former B Division — were completed in 2020. In 2024, Sonya Kilkenny, the Victorian Minister for Planning, intervened to approve a proposal for the construction of 11- and 12-storey apartment towers in the precinct for the delivery of 245 new homes. The proposal exceeded the height limits set out in the masterplan approved in 2016 and was not supported by the local City of Merri-bek council.

The Victorian branch of the National Trust was licensed to operate tours of A, B, and H Divisions, and tours of H Division opened in 2023, with some former prisoners commenting that the tours were focused on the most hardened criminals.

Southern precinct — Pentridge Village

The precinct, acquired by the Chiavaroli brothers, is bordered by Pentridge Boulevard, Stockade Avenue, Wardens Walk and Urquhart Street, and was essentially the site of the former HM Metropolitan Prison. (Note: Identified as "Precinct 10" in the former Moreland Planning Scheme, clause 1.0 and 5.10 of clause 37.08, Schedule 1 to the Activity Centre Zone.) Following approval of the 2009 masterplan, the c.4-hectare-site (10-acre) (Note: Sources vary on the plot size, with The Australian Financial Review stating 3.7 ha (9.1 acres), and another source stating 4.2 ha (10 acres).) was sold as a distressed asset by liquidators to Future Estate in 2015 for A$4 million. (Note: The reported price varies from A$4 million to A$27 million.) A 9,203-square-metre (99,060 sq ft) portion of the site, with development approvals, was sold by Future Estate to Golden Sunrise in 2017 for A$12.8 million. Future Estate sold the former D Division to Pentridge Cellars Pty Ltd for the operation of a boutique brewery.

== Gallery ==
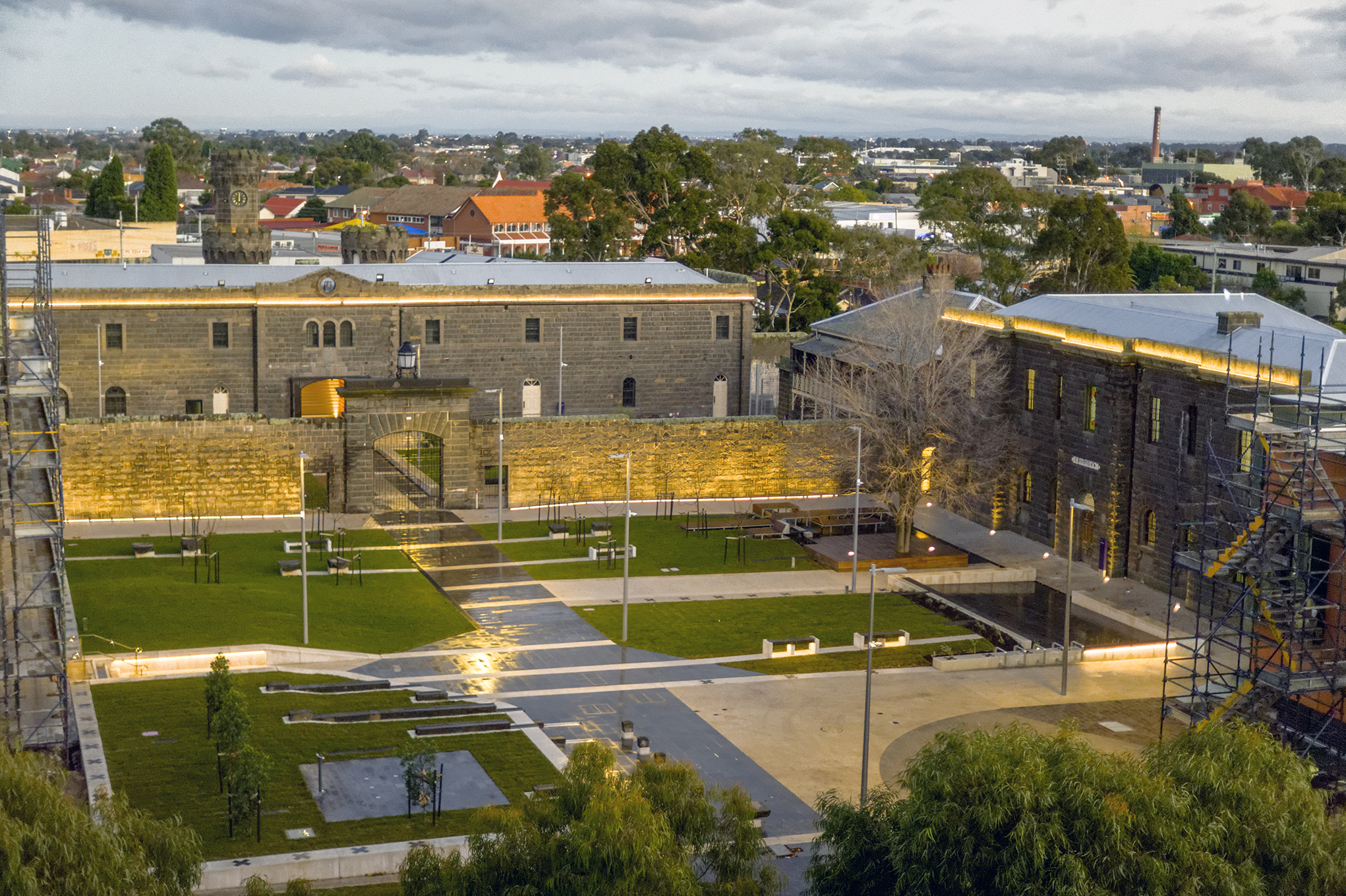
Pentridge Prison E Division courtyard, 2020

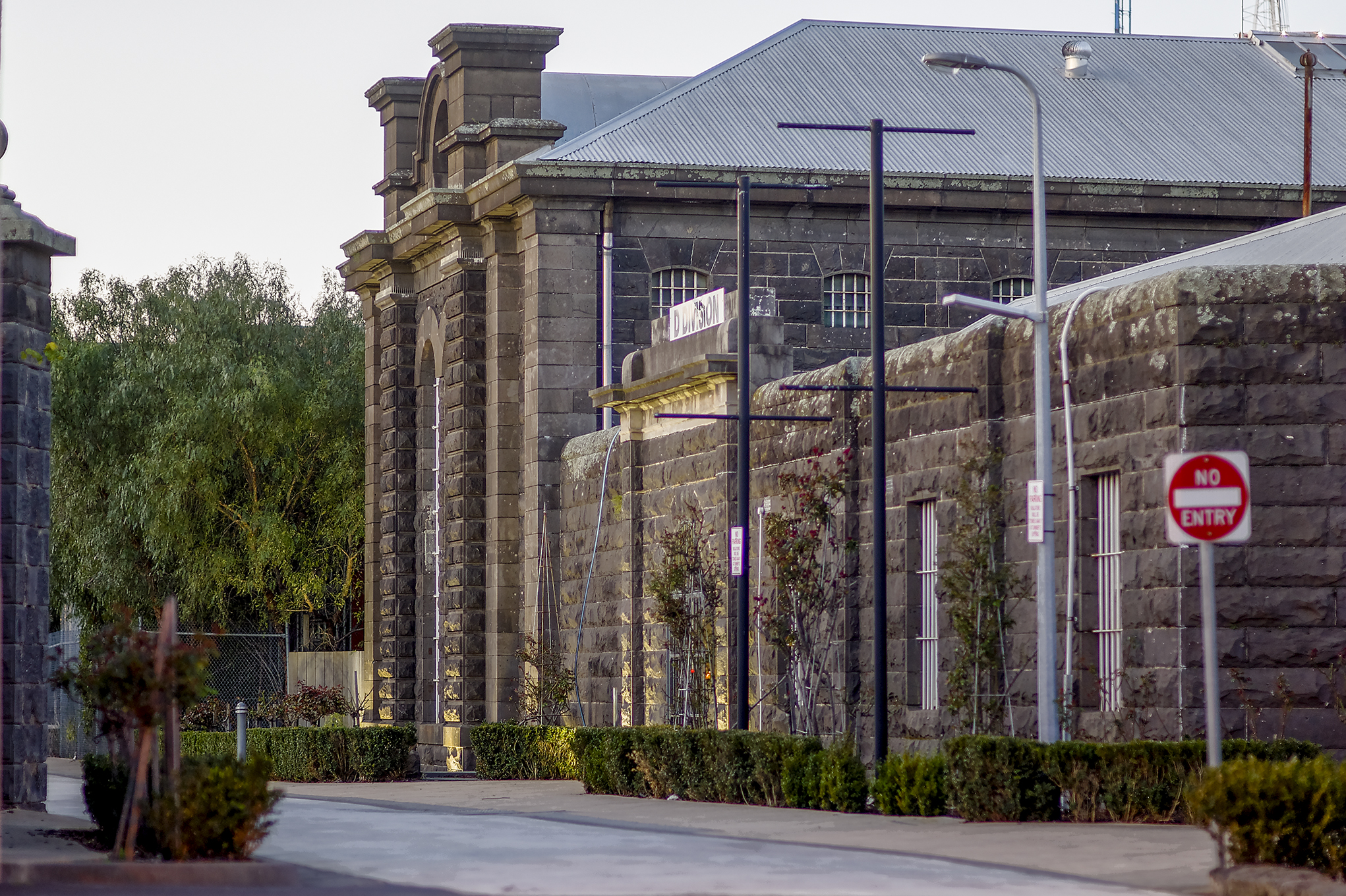
HM Prison Pentridge D Division, 2020

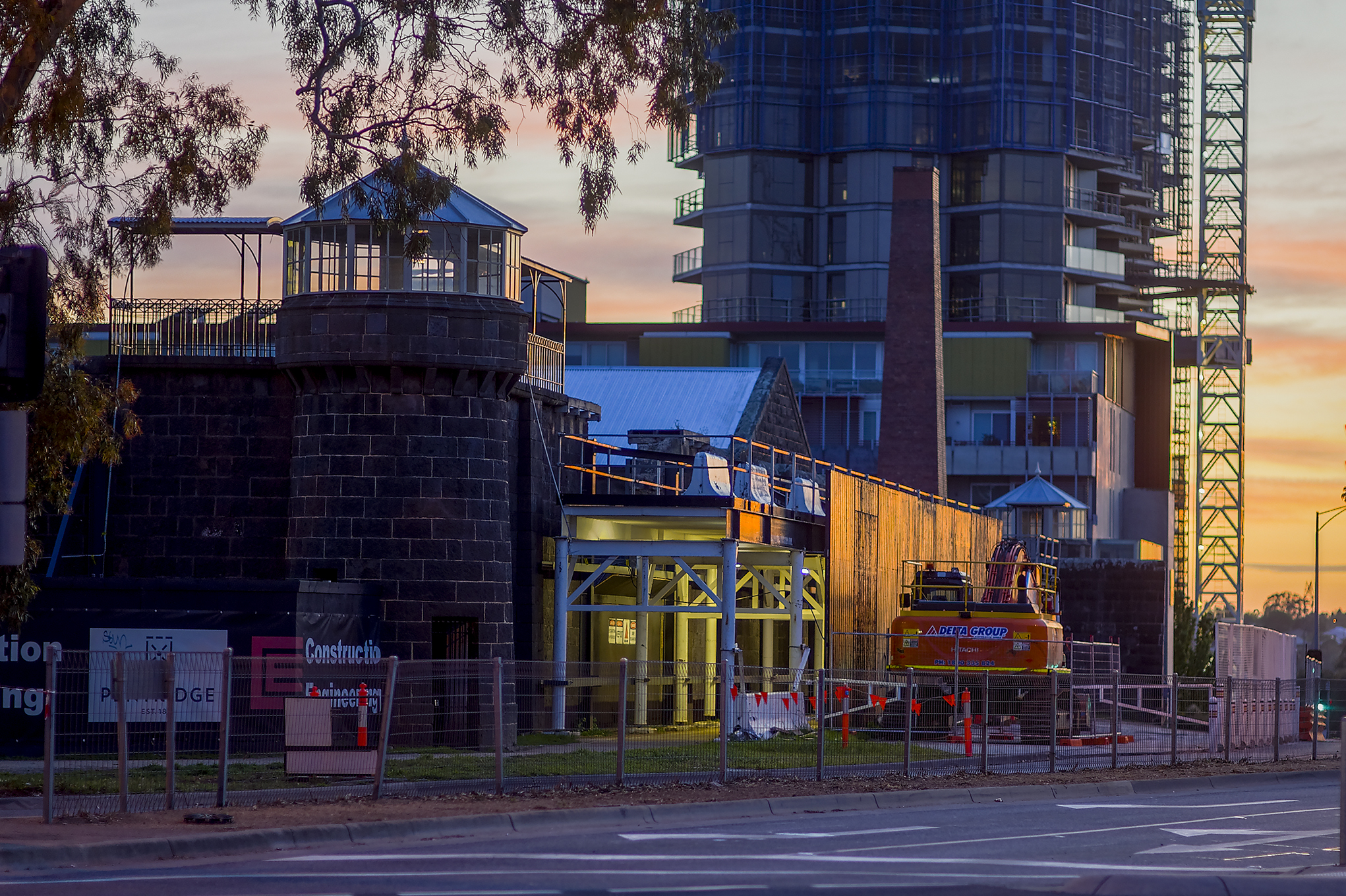
Looking east along Pentridge Boulevard, 2020

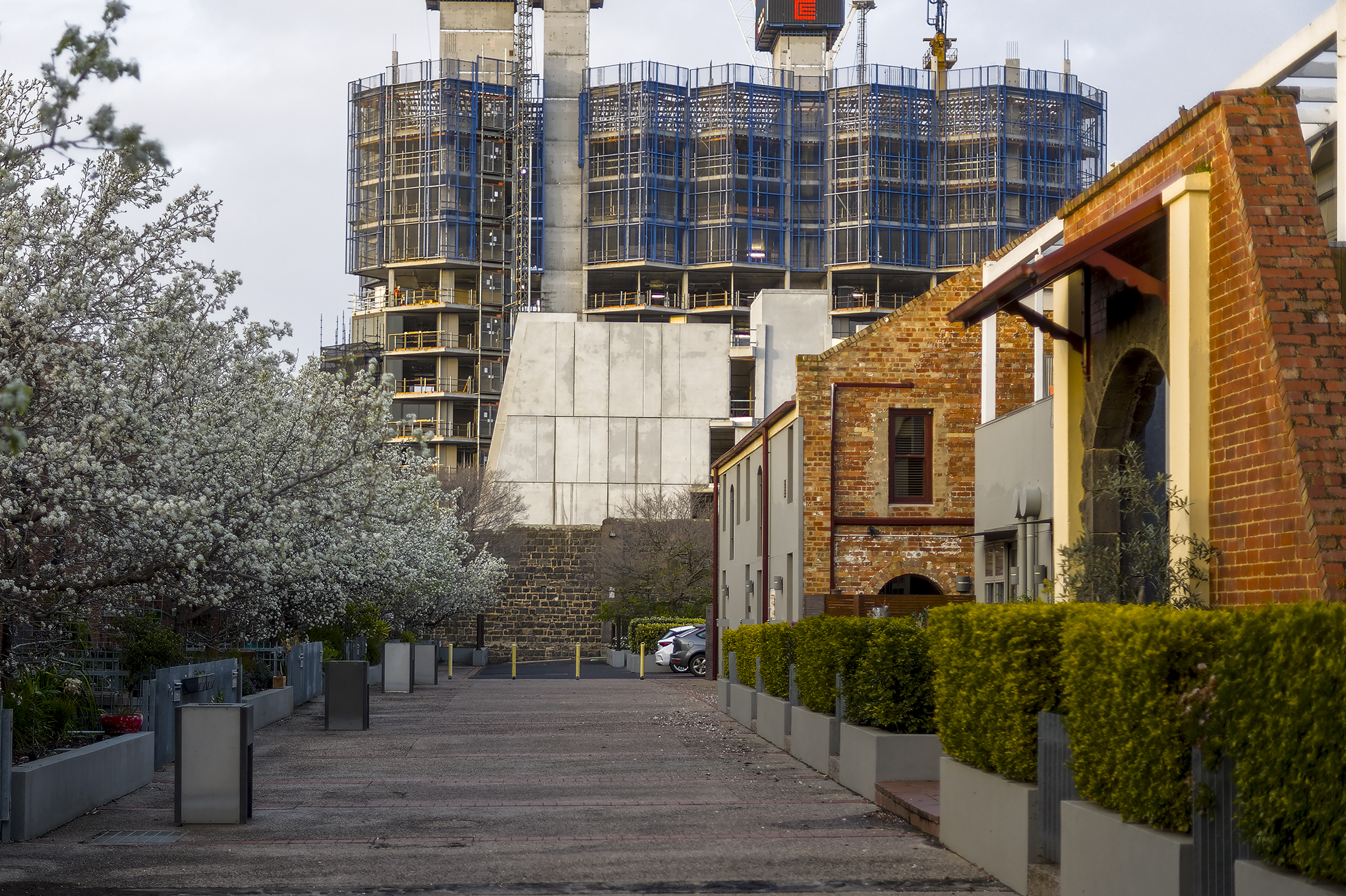
Industry Lane, Coburg, 2020

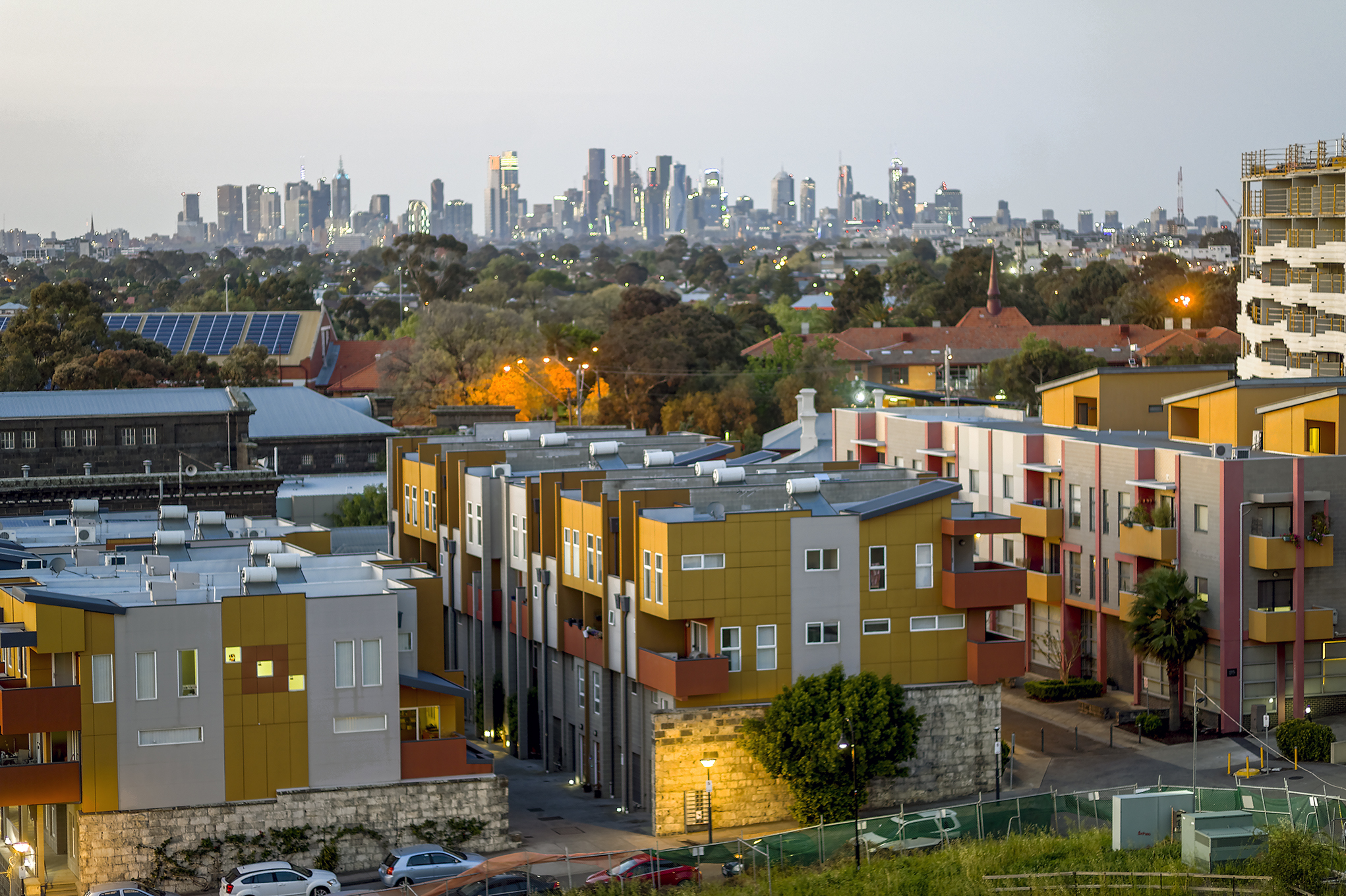
Looking south towards the Melbourne city centre from Pentridge Boulevard, 2020

== See also ==
- Arundel (house)
- Bluestone Cottage Museum
- List of prisons in Victoria
- List of places on the Victorian Heritage Register in the City of Merri-bek
- Murray Road Bridge
- Newlands Road Bridge
