= Arundel (disambiguation) =

Arundel is a town in southern England.

Arundel may also refer to:

== Locations and districts ==
=== United Kingdom ===
- Arundel (UK Parliament constituency), a UK Parliament constituency between 1974 and 1997, serving the abovementioned town of Arundel, West Sussex
  - Arundel and South Downs (UK Parliament constituency) (from 1997)
- Arundel (Liverpool ward), an electoral district of the Liverpool City Council

=== United States ===
- Arundel, Maine
- Anne Arundel County, Maryland
  - Arundel Mills, a mall in Anne Arundel County
  - Arundel Preserve, a mixed-use development near Arundel Mills
- Kennebunkport, Maine, named Arundel from the 1700s until 1821

=== Elsewhere ===
- Arundel, New Zealand
- Arundel, Quebec, Canada
- Arundel, Queensland, Australia, a suburb of the Gold Coast
- Arundel Island, Solomon Islands

== People ==
- Earls of Arundel, an earldom in England
- Joe Arundel, professional rugby league footballer
- Thomas Arundel (1353–1414), Archbishop of Canterbury
  - Thomas Arundel (disambiguation), other people of that name
- Dohickey Arundel, an American Revolutionary War officer, killed in an assault on Gwynn's Island, Virginia
- Arundel Wrighte, an early settler in Colonial Australia

== Arts, entertainment, and media ==
- Arundel, an 1800 novel by Harriet Lee
- Arundel (novel), a 1929 novel by Kenneth Roberts
- "An Arundel Tomb", a poem by Philip Larkin
- Arundel Manuscripts, a collection of manuscripts in the British Library
- Arundel, the name of the estate that is the main setting of The Penderwicks

== Other uses ==
Schools

- Arundel School, an independent school in Harare, Zimbabwe
- Anne Arundel County Public Schools a public school system in Maryland, United States
- Arundel High School, a public high school in Anne Arundel county, Maryland, United States

Transportation

- Arundel, a passenger train operated by the Maine Central Railroad

Organizations

- Arundel Society, a society founded in London in 1849 and discontinued in 1897

Geology

- Arundel Formation, a sedimentary rock formation in the Atlantic coast of the United States

Buildings

- Arundel, Coburg, a heritage-listed house in Melbourne, Victoria, Australia

== See also ==
- Arundell (disambiguation)
