= Henry Stuart, Duke of Gloucester =

English and Scottish prince (1640–1660)

Henry Stuart
- Duke of Gloucester
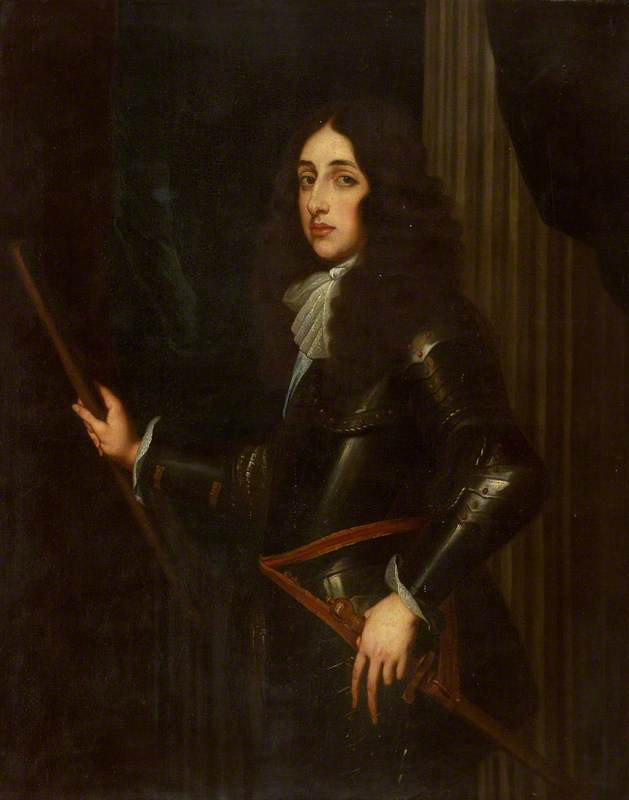
- Portrait by Jan Boeckhorst, c. 1659
- Born: 8 July 1640; Oatlands Palace, Surrey, England
- Died: 13 September 1660 (aged 20); Palace of Whitehall, London, England
- Burial: 21 September 1660; Westminster Abbey, London
- House: Stuart
- Father: Charles I of England
- Mother: Henrietta Maria of France

Henry Stuart, Duke of Gloucester (8 July 1640 – 13 September 1660) (Note: All dates in this article are in the Old Style Julian calendar, in use in England throughout Henry's lifetime.) was the youngest son of Charles I, King of England, Scotland, and Ireland, and Henrietta Maria of France. He is also known as Henry of Oatlands.

From the age of two, Henry and his sister Elizabeth were separated from their family during the English Civil War and became prisoners of Parliament. For several years, the children were constantly transported from one residence to another due to the plague raging in London. They also periodically changed their governesses and guardians to those more loyal to the government. In 1645, Henry and Elizabeth were joined by their elder brother James, Duke of York, who found himself in a difficult financial situation. In 1647, Charles I was arrested and during the years 1647–1648, he was allowed to see his children several times. In April 1648, James fled the country; it was probably planned that he would take Henry with him, but Elizabeth was afraid to let her younger brother go. When in 1649 Charles I was sentenced to death, he, fearing that Henry would be proclaimed king and made a puppet of the government, took an oath from his 8-year-old son not to take the crown for anything while both of his older brothers were alive.

After the execution of Charles I, Scotland proclaimed his eldest son Charles II as their sovereign. In the summer of 1650, he landed in Scotland, which prompted Parliament to send the children of the late monarch to Carisbrooke Castle on the Isle of Wight, where their father had previously been imprisoned. Before leaving for Carisbrooke, Henry and Elizabeth were stripped of all titles and privileges. Shortly after arriving on the Isle of Wight in September 1650, Henry's sister fell ill and died. Henry remained at Carisbrooke until the following year, when, with the permission of Oliver Cromwell, he returned to the continent, where he eventually joined his mother in Paris. With Henrietta Maria, whom the prince had not seen for eleven years, Henry did not have a good understanding: the prince was an ardent Protestant, and his mother was an implacable Catholic. The Queen, against the wishes of her late husband and eldest son, tried to convert Henry to Catholicism, but this only deteriorated their relationship. Henry went to his brother Charles in Cologne. In 1657, the prince fought on the side of the Spanish against France with his brother James. In May 1659, Charles restored to his brother the title of Duke of Gloucester, which Henry had been deprived of by Parliament in 1650, and bestowed the title of Earl of Cambridge.

After the restoration of the monarchy in England in 1660, Henry accompanied his brother during his return to Britain. There Henry received a number of appointments, but before the coronation of Charles II, he contracted smallpox and died. He was buried in the vault of Mary, Queen of Scots in Westminster Abbey, where his elder sister Mary, who also died of smallpox, was buried a few weeks later.

== Birth and early years ==
Henry was born on 8 July 1640 at Oatlands Palace near Weybridge in Surrey as the youngest son and penultimate child of King Charles I of England, Scotland, and Ireland and his wife, Henrietta Maria of France. In total, the royal couple had nine children—four sons and five daughters; the eldest son of the royal couple, Charles James, was either stillborn or died immediately after birth, the fourth daughter, Catherine, died less than half an hour after baptism, and the third daughter, Anne, died at the age of three. Since Henry was born after the death of Charles James, throughout his life he was the third son of the King. With the deaths of Catherine and Anne, the boy also became the fifth child of the royal couple to survive infancy.

His paternal grandparents were King James VI of Scotland and I of England (the first one of the House of Stuart in England) and his wife Anne of Denmark, and his maternal grandparents were King Henry IV of France and his wife Marie de' Medici; of all his grandparents at the time of Henry's birth, only Marie de Medici (Note: Henry IV was assassinated in 1610, James VI and I died in 1625, Anne of Denmark died in 1619.) was alive. The prince was baptized on 22 July 1640, and his only godmother was his elder sister Mary, for whom this ceremony was her first public appearance. From birth, Henry received the title of Duke of Gloucester. (Note: The duchy was assigned to the crown, although the Earldom of Gloucester did not belong to the royal family.)

In the spring of 1641, Henry's elder sister and godmother, nine-year-old Mary, was betrothed to William, the eldest son and heir of Frederick Henry, Prince of Orange. It was planned that until reaching the age of twelve (the minimum age of marriage consent) the princess would remain in England, but by the beginning of 1642 the situation in the country was tense, and in February Mary and her mother left for The Hague. Henrietta Maria hurriedly said goodbye to Henry and Elizabeth at Hampton Court Palace and did not see her son again until 1653: in August 1642, the English Civil War broke out, and two-year-old Henry and his sister were held as hostages in the hands of the English Parliament.

== English Civil War ==
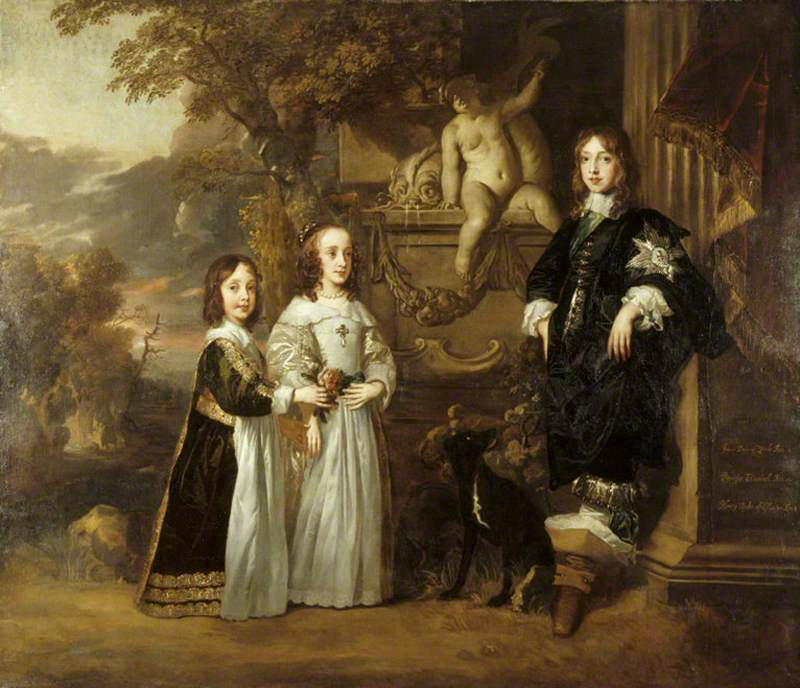
A 7-year-old Henry at left, alongside his siblings James, Duke of York, the future James II, and Princess Elizabeth, portrait by Sir Peter Lely, 1647.

As a result of the civil war that began in August, Charles I and Henrietta Maria were forced to leave their two youngest children at that time, Henry and Elizabeth, in the care of Parliament. In October 1642, the plague reached the outskirts of Hampton Court Palace, where the siblings lived together. Elizabeth, who had not been in good health since childhood, fell ill again and was so weak that she could not leave the capital. On the recommendation of the governess, the Countess of Roxburghe, and with the permission of the House of Lords, the children were transferred to St James's Palace for lack of a more suitable residence. Although Parliament did not intend to punish the children for the actions of their father, at the same time, the amount of expenses for the court of the prince and princess was considered, and in the process of discussion it was decided to dismiss without payment of salary almost all the servants who, in the opinion of Parliament, were papists, sympathizers or simply opponents of Parliament. However, Elizabeth achieved some mitigation for the court, although the children were replaced by a chaplain and cut costs for the wardrobe, which became truly puritanical.

In December 1642 and January 1643, Henry and Elizabeth were visited by two of the King's squires, with the permission of Parliament, to make sure that the children were healthy and did not need anything. Later, the prince and his sister were completely deprived of wardrobe payments: this was the result of the confrontation between Charles I and the Parliament; as the representative of the House of Commons wrote: "...if the King wants to fight with us, they [children] must pay for clothes at their own expense!". This action angered not only the King, but also the children's governess, the Countess of Roxburghe, who wrote a letter to the Parliament. After an investigation by the House of Commons and a second discussion, it was decided to return the payments; however, all expenses of Henry and Elizabeth had to be announced publicly. In addition, an investigation and discussion were held by the House of Lords, which confirmed the decision of the House of Commons. The royal children were allotted an amount of £800 a month each, the expenditure of which was overseen by an officer, Sir Ralph Freeman. The Parliament also conducted an investigation into the activities of the clerics of the chapel of the royal palace to make sure that children were brought up in the "correct" religion. On 20 July 1643, the staff of the servants of the royal children were again revised: the Countess of Roxburghe was replaced by the Countess of Dorset, who was loyal to the government.

In the summer of 1643, Parliament decided to transfer Henry and his sister to Oxford under the protection of the local garrison, but in the fall during a game, Elizabeth fell and broke her leg, and Parliament decided to postpone the move. By the summer of 1644, the princess had fully recovered from her injury, but soon fell ill. In July, doctors recommended that Elizabeth change the climate, so the children were moved to Chelsea, to the residence of Sir John Danvers, who would later become one of the signatories of the death warrant of Charles I. During the move, Henry and Elizabeth were denied the honorary escort that was due to members of the royal family. At the same time, the plague epidemic did not weaken the position, so the prince and princess were moved from time to time from one residence to another: St James's, Whitehall and Chelsea. By winter, the royal children were again transported, but not as planned to St James's Palace, next to which the plague was raging, but to Whitehall, which seemed more reliable.

At the beginning of 1645, the governess of the children, the Countess of Dorset, fell seriously ill and died. Shortly before her death, Henry and Elizabeth were placed under the care of the Earl and Countess of Northumberland, which was reported in the newspapers on 13 March 1645. The Earl was a close friend of the King and therefore treated his children with all respect and care. Under the care of the Northumberlands, the royal children spent a happy summer at one of the Earl 's residences, probably Syon House. Elizabeth wrote about this to her older sister, Mary, on 11 September 1645. On the day on which the letter to Mary is dated, hearings were held in Parliament on the maintenance of the royal children; the composition of the servants, the amount required for the maintenance of the children and their court, as well as the place of their permanent residence were agreed. The Earl of Northumberland was asked to choose one of the royal residences, and he chose St James's Palace, where Henry and Elizabeth were soon transferred. Also, the Earl managed to achieve a reduction in the number of protection of children for their comfort.

In September, the prince's brother, the Duke of York, found himself in a difficult position: he was in Oxford, where the plague was creeping up, accumulated debts and lost all provisions. In a letter to his father, he asked permission to join his brother and sister in London. The prince did not wait for an answer from his father, but Parliament approved the move and the placement of the prince under the guardianship of the Earl of Northumberland and with a magnificent escort delivered the boy to St James's Palace. The Duke of York remained with his brother and sister until April 1648.

=== Father's arrest and execution ===
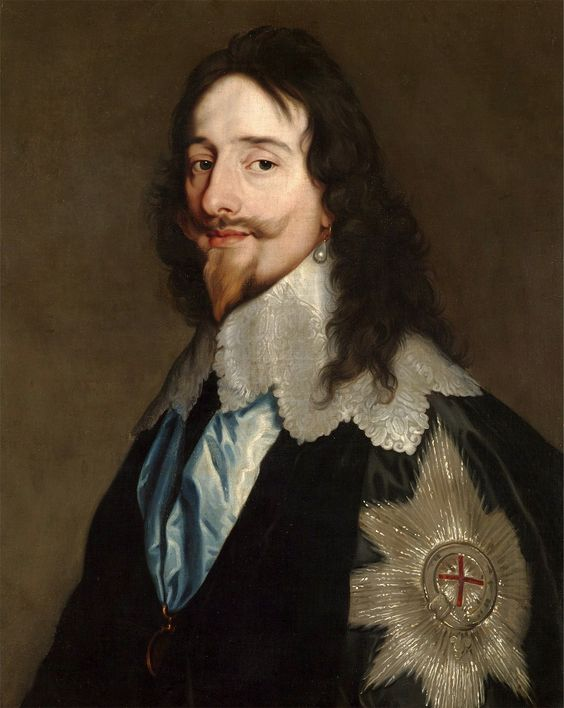
King Charles I of England, portrait by Anthony van Dyck, c. 1638.

In March 1647, the Earl of Northumberland moved the royal children to Hampton Court Palace, but almost immediately they were recalled back to St James's Palace. At the same time, the Scots handed over Charles I to the English Parliament. According to the decision of Parliament, the King was to be placed under arrest in Caversham, and before leaving, Charles I, having learned how close his children were to him, asked to see them. In the summer of 1647, due to a new epidemic, the Earl of Northumberland was forced to transport the royal children from one residence to another and ended up staying at Syon House. In August, the arrested King was again transported to Hampton Court Palace, from where on the 23rd he was allowed to leave for Syon House and see his children there. On 31 August, the visit was repeated, and on 7 September, Henry, with his brother and sister, arrived at Hampton Court Palace to see their father. On one of these visits, the King insisted that his youngest son should not be subjected to religious pressure; it is not clear whether he feared the influence of Catholics or Protestants. At the same time, Charles I gave all three children a conflicting instruction "to be faithful to the Anglican Church, but more than that, to their Catholic mother".

In October, Parliament planned to move the children to St James's Palace for the winter; learning of this, the King asked the government to allow the Earl of Northumberland to transmit letters between Charles I and his children and to allow them to visit their father from time to time. Charles I's request was granted, but in November 1647 the King managed to escape. Upon learning of her father's escape, Elizabeth took every opportunity to persuade her older brother, the Duke of York, to flee the country; this was done, probably, according to the instructions given by Charles I earlier and in correspondence with Elizabeth. Thanks to the ingenuity of the princess, James managed to deceive the personal guard and, disguised as a woman in Elizabeth's chambers, escaped to the continent to The Hague at the side of his sister Mary on 21 April 1648. Probably, the King planned that Henry would also escape with the Duke of York, but Elizabeth was afraid to let Henry go because he was too small. After James's escape, Parliament investigated and ordered the Earl of Northumberland to transport Henry and Elizabeth without delay to one of the residences –Syon House or Hampton Court– and the Earl chose Syon House.

In August 1648, Charles I was again captured, but in October he sent an encouraging letter from Newport to his daughter Elizabeth with his trusted servant Sir Thomas Herbert, with whom the princess had a long conversation about her father. The fateful autumn and winter of 1648 remained vague for Henry and Elizabeth: they did not receive any more news from their father, in addition, the Earl of Northumberland took them out of town for the whole winter and did not devote all the details of the trial of the King—a process that horrified him. However, the royal children knew that on 26 January 1649, Charles I was convicted and sentenced to death. The day before the sentencing, he asked to see the children; a similar request was submitted to the government on 27 January. On 29 January, the day before the execution, the King was allowed to see Henry and Elizabeth, after which the royal children were returned to Syon House.

At their last meeting, Charles I gave instructions to his children. He feared that after his death, Henry might be proclaimed King and made a puppet in the hands of Parliament. The King knelt down in front of his son and said: "Now they will deprive your father of his head. Listen, my child, what I say: they will decapitate me and, perhaps, make you King. But remember what I say. You must not become King while your brothers Charles and James are both alive...I oblige you not to become King before them". Eight-year-old Henry replied that he would rather be torn apart first.

=== Change of guardians and death of sister ===
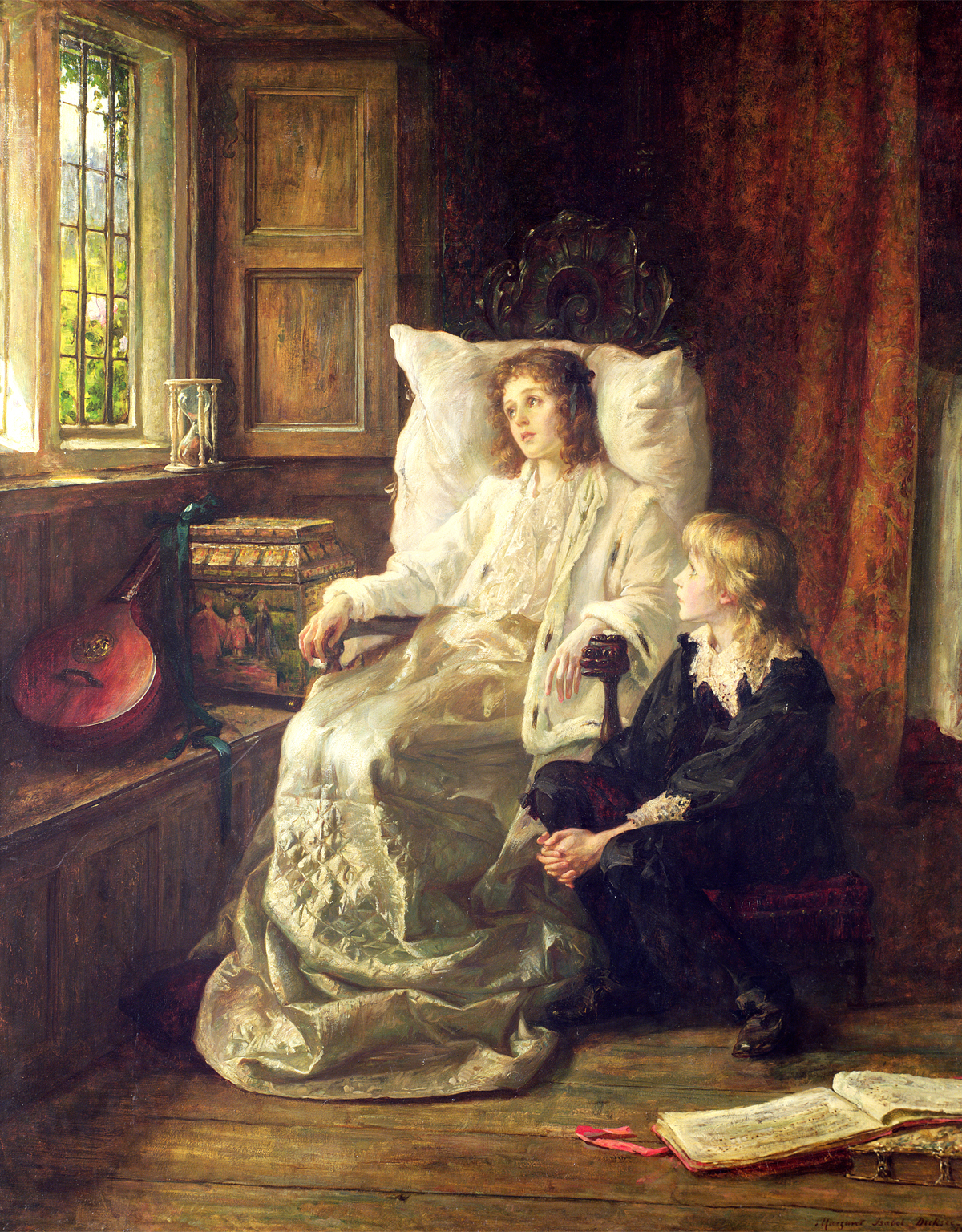
The Children of Charles I, by Margaret Isabel Dicksee, 1895.

There are no records of how the royal children spent the fateful hours of 30 January 1649. By this time, their guardian the Earl of Northumberland had become very attached to the children of Charles I. He became one of five English peers who opposed the execution of the King. As a result, the royal children were transferred to the care of the Earl and Countess of Leicester at Penshurst Place. Elizabeth, who did not want to move to new, and in her opinion, less benevolent guardians, again sent a request to Parliament to let her and Henry go to live with their sister Mary in Holland, and again to no avail. The royal children, accompanied by the Countess of Leicester and ten or eleven servants, arrived at Penshurst on 14 June 1649.

In Penshurst Place, the Countess of Leicester was mainly involved in the upbringing of the royal children, since the Earl was almost constantly in London. The numerous children of the Earl and Countess became companions of Henry and Elizabeth; with them, they sat at the table without royal honors, but as members of the family. This was done on the basis of instructions given by Parliament. Here the royal children were lucky to have a mentor, Robert Lovel, who was a maternal relative of the Earl of Leicester and a supporter of the royalists. Shortly after being sent to the Leicester household, rumors spread that royal children might be poisoned or sent to an insane asylum or charity school under the names of Harry and Bessie Stewart; there were also fears that the children would become victims of the matrimonial plans of their guardians. However, most likely, these rumors were spread by order of their mother Henrietta Maria, who was in exile in France, and had no basis.

The Parliament had a real plan, according to which the royal children were to be deprived of all their privileges, transferred to the custody of a trusted family and raised in obscurity but this plan was not destined to come true: immediately after the execution of Charles I, Scotland proclaimed Henry's elder brother, Charles II, as its new king. In the summer of 1650, when it became known that Charles II had landed in Scotland, it was decided to transfer Henry and Elizabeth to Carisbrook Castle on the Isle of Wight, where their father had previously been imprisoned, under the care of Anthony Mildmay and his wife. Elizabeth was horrified at the prospect of being imprisoned in her father's former prison and petitioned for her and her brother to be left in Penshurst Place on the pretext of the princess's ill health, but was unsuccessful. Before leaving for Carisbrook Castle, the number of the royal children's servants was reduced to four people (including Lovel); they were deprived of their status of prince and princess, and Henry of his the ducal title: Elizabeth was now called Lady Elizabeth Stewart, and Henry was named Harry Stewart or Mr. Harry.

On 23 August, about a week after arriving at Carisbrook Castle, Elizabeth fell ill after playing outdoors. On 8 September 1650 at 3 o'clock in the afternoon, she died, and ten-year-old Henry was left alone.

== Life abroad ==
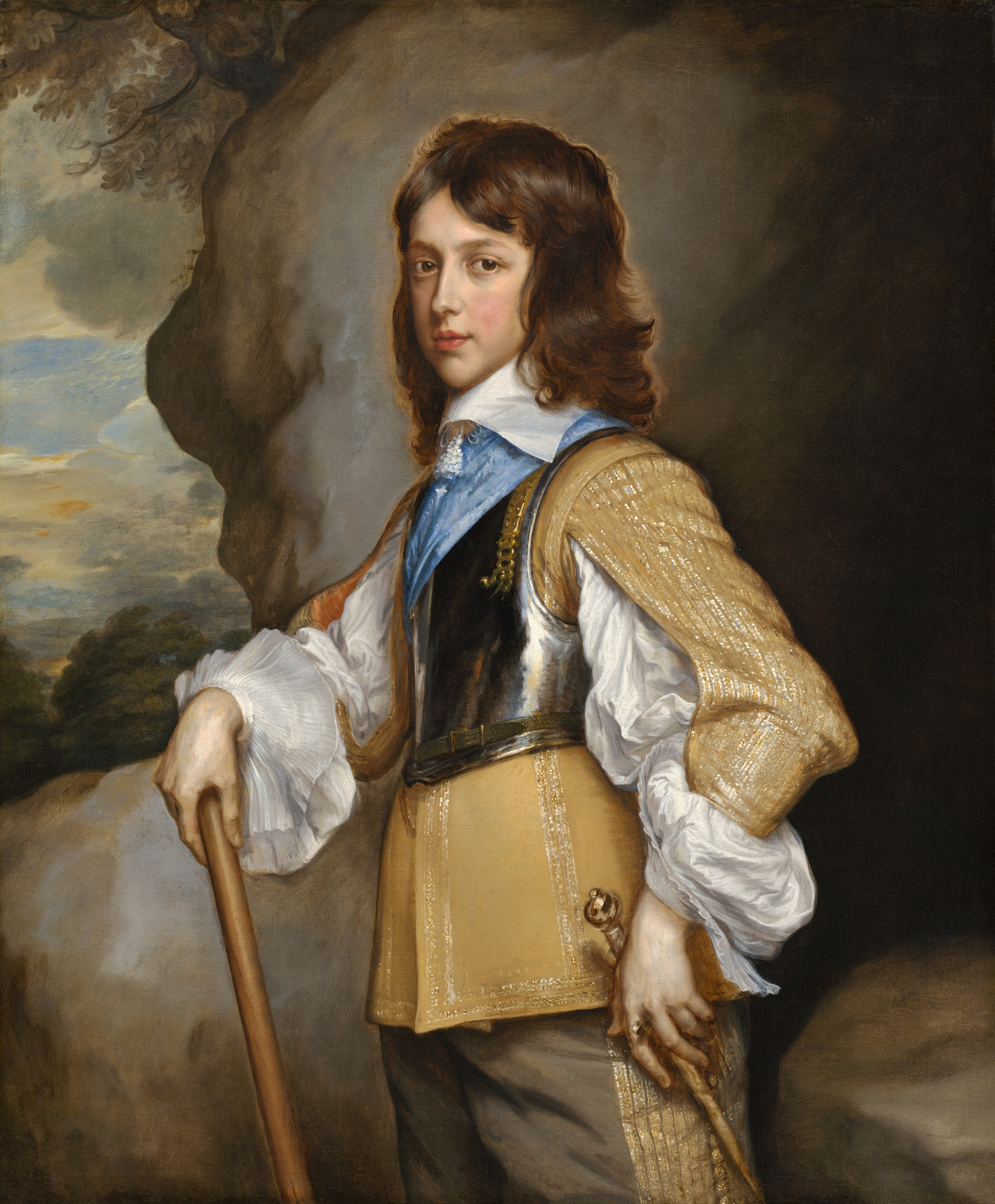
Prince Henry, portrait by Adriaen Hanneman, c. 1653. This portrait was made during the prince's early exile in Paris.

Henry remained at Carisbrooke Castle until 1652, when Oliver Cromwell allowed the prince to leave the country and provided him with funds to cover his travel expenses. Henry went to Holland to his sister Mary, where he was warmly received by her and other relatives. Here, on Easter Sunday 1653, the prince was knighted in the Order of the Garter. Then, at the special invitation of his mother, the prince joined her in Paris. In 1653, his elder brother Charles II went to Germany, where he moved his court a year later; he offered to take Henry with him, but their mother insisted that the prince stay in Paris: Henrietta Maria believed that after a long stay in England, Henry should improve his education in the capital of France. Charles II yielded to his mother on the condition that she would not force Henry to change his faith.

With his mother, the prince, who had not seen her since the age of two, could not establish a good understanding, because during the separation he became a zealous Protestant, and Henrietta Maria was a staunch Catholic. The widow of Charles I went against the will of her eldest son and late husband, to whom she also promised not to persuade her youngest sons to change their faith, and tried to convert not only Henry, but also her other son, James, Duke of York, to Catholicism. The more mature James became fascinated with his mother's religion but did not convert to Catholicism until many years after her death. Henrietta Maria could not give up trying to make her youngest son a Catholic, because she believed that only the true church could save his soul. At first, she acted cautiously and did not even send away his teacher Robert Lovel, who professed Anglicanism, from his son. Henry visited his brother James, and on his return to Paris found that his teacher had been sent back to England. The prince was transferred to the care of the Aumônier (Note: Chaplain or church officer who originally was in charge of distributing money to the deserving poor.) of Henrietta Maria, Walter Montagu, abbot of a monastery near Pontoise, who was supposed to take care of the religious education of fourteen-year-old Henry. In the absence of Lovel, the prince succumbed to the abbot's persuasion and agreed to get acquainted with Catholicism, but was deeply indignant at the actions of his mother. Not getting a quick result, Henrietta Maria joined Montague and began to persuade her son to change religion but Henry was adamant, and it was decided to send him to a Jesuit College.

When news of his mother's actions reached Charles II, he became furious and immediately sent the Marquess of Ormonde to Paris to bring Henry to him in Cologne. Initially, Henry refused to leave Paris, and Ormond agreed with his decision. At the same time, the prince assured his mother that he intended to adhere to the Protestant religion in all dangers, to which she stated that she did not want to see him anymore. When Henry returned from another Anglican service, he found that, on the orders of Henrietta Maria, his horses had been taken out of the stables, bedding removed from his bed, and orders had been given to the kitchen not to cook food for the prince; this meant that the prince was effectively kicked out of the palace. Henry moved into the house of Lord Hutton, where he spent two months, while the Marquess of Ormond collected funds to send the prince to his brother in Cologne. Thus, Henrietta Maria's attempts to convert Henry to Catholicism not only failed and angered the royalists and Charles II, but also completely ruined her relationship with her younger son.

Henry remained with Charles in Cologne until 1656. In July 1655, their sister Mary visited them, then together they made a trip to Frankfurt, where they visited the fair incognito, although they did not manage to remain unrecognised. Prior to this, Henry had also visited Mary in the Netherlands a couple of times with his brother and alone. In 1656 the brothers left for Bruges, where Henry became a member of the Archers of Saint George. In December 1656, Henry became colonel of the "old" English regiment of the Spanish army and volunteered with his brother James to enter the service of the Spanish in 1657 in the Low Countries. The mother of the princes opposed: she believed that Henry was too young to become a soldier. The prince did not listen to her and fought side by side with his brother in the defence of Dunkirk on 17 June 1658, where both showed great courage. When the city fell, Henry managed to escape capture by gathering some of the scattered troops and making a desperate breakthrough through the enemy battle formations. In the battle, the prince lost his sword, and while Villeneuve, the groom of the Prince de Ligne, was looking for the lost weapon, Henry covered him with a pistol.

On 26 February 1657 or 1658, Charles II knighted his brother, on 27 October 1658 he introduced him to his Privy Council, and on 13 May 1659 he restored to him the title of Duke of Gloucester and additionally bestowed him the title of Earl of Cambridge.

== Stuart Restoration and death ==
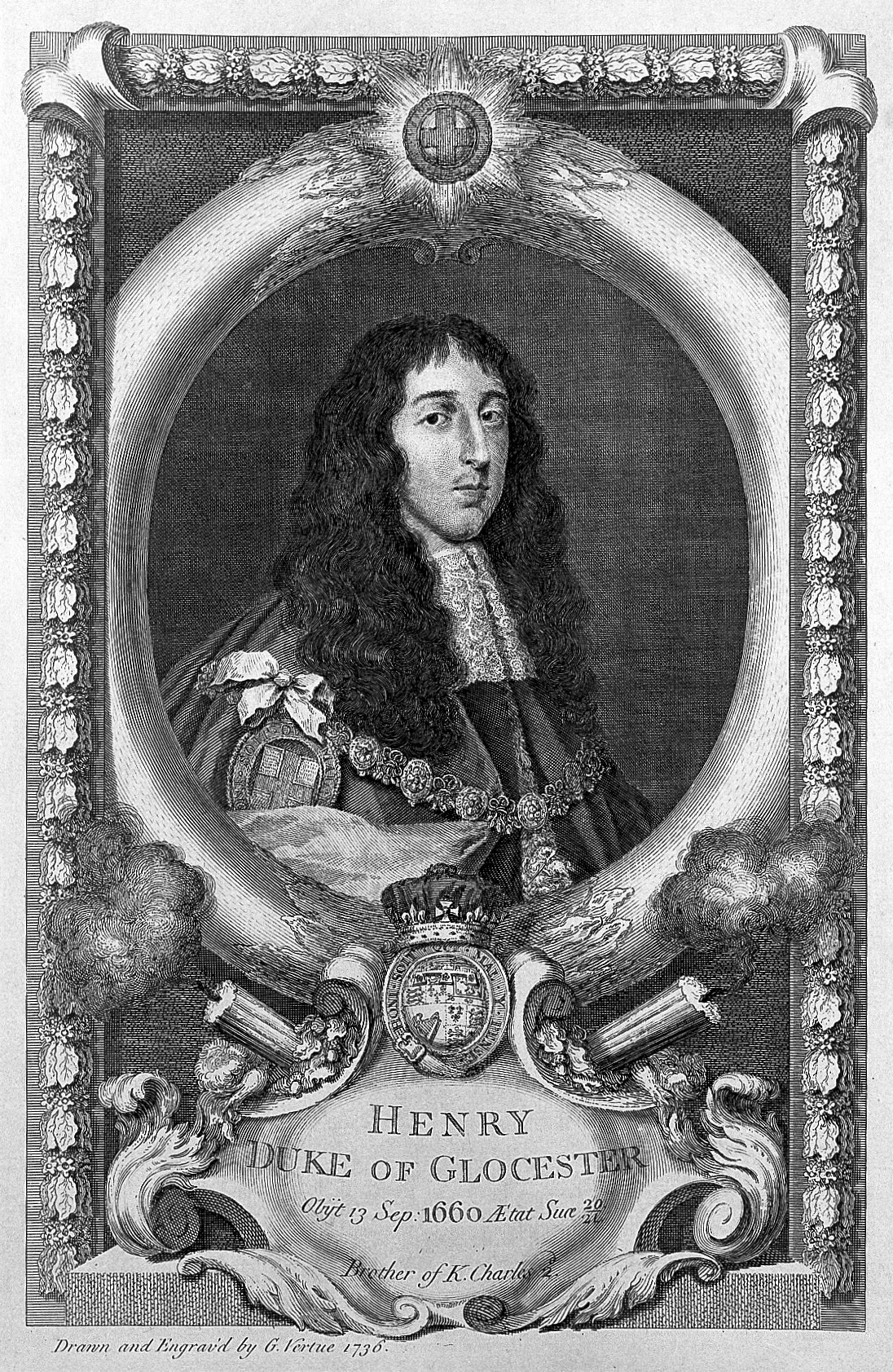
18th-century posthumous print of Henry, Duke of Gloucester, by George Vertue

Following the restoration of the monarchy in England in 1660, Henry accompanied his brother Charles II to his homeland; the costs of their trip were again paid by Parliament. Henry settled in the Palace of Whitehall and on 30 June 1660 he was already sitting in the House of Lords. On 13 June he was appointed Chief Steward of Gloucester, and on 3 July he became Ranger of Hyde Park.

Early in September 1660, Henry contracted smallpox, an epidemic that raged in London. The prince died on 13 September 1660 before his brother Charles II's coronation. On 21 September, his remains were moved to Somerset House, from where they were taken by river to Westminster. He was buried in Westminster Abbey in the vault of Mary, Queen of Scots. Henry's death overshadowed the joy of a family reunion. A few weeks later Henry's elder sister Mary, Dowager Princess of Orange, also died of smallpox; on her deathbed, she wished to be buried next to her brother.

The Earl of Clarendon, an English historian, statesman and father of the Duke of York's first wife, wrote enthusiastically of Henry as a fine youth, "of the most manly understanding that I ever knew" and as "a prince of extraordinary hopes, both from the comeliness and gracefulness of his person and the vivacity and vigour of his wit and understand." Gilbert Burnet believed that the prince "was of a temper different from that of his two brothers. He was active and loved business, was apt to have particular friendships, and had an insinuating temper, which was generally very acceptable." According to Burnet, "his death was much lamented by all, but more particularly by the King, who was never in his whole life seen so much trouble as he was on that occasion."

Charles II planned to betroth Henry to Princess Wilhelmine Ernestine of Denmark to reinforce the English-Danish maritime alliance, and King Frederick III of Denmark also agreed to the marriage, but the prince's early death prevented this union. Henry's death led to the fact that the throne eventually passed to William III and Mary II—the children of Henry's older sister and older brother, respectively, and later to the House of Hanover.

== Ancestry ==
Ancestors of Henry Stuart, Duke of Gloucester

8. Henry Stuart, Lord Darnley
4. James I of England (VI of Scotland)
9. Mary, Queen of Scots
2. Charles I of England
10. Frederick II of Denmark
5. Anne of Denmark
11. Sophia of Mecklenburg
1. Henry, Duke of Gloucester
12. Anthony, Duke of Vendôme
6. Henry IV of France
13. Joan III of Navarre
3. Henrietta Maria of France
14. Francis I de' Medici, Grand Duke of Tuscany
7. Marie de' Medici
15. Joanna of Austria

== Bibliography ==
- Ashmole, Elias (1672). The Institution, Laws & Ceremonies of the Most Noble Order of the Garter. J. Macock.
- Beatty, Michael A. (2003). The English Royal Family of America, from Jamestown to the American Revolution. McFarland. pp. 43–47. ISBN 978-0-7864-1558-8.
- Boutell, Charles (2010). A Manual of Heraldry: Historical and Popular (1863). Kessinger Publishing. pp. 245–246. ISBN 978-1-1652-9931-7.
- Callow, John (2000). The Making of King James II: The Formative Years of a Fallen King. Gloucestershire: Sutton. pp. 143–149. ISBN 978-0-7509-2398-9.
- Cartwright, Julia (1900). Madame: a life of Henrietta, daughter of Charles I and Duchess of Orleans. London: Seeley and Co.Ltd.
- Chester, Joseph Lemuel, ed. (1876), The Marriage, Baptismal, and Burial Registers of the Collegiate Church or Abbey of St. Peter, Westminster, London: Harleian Society
- Everett Green, Mary Anne (1855). Lives of the Princesses of England. Vol. VI. Henry Colburn. pp. 335–396.
- Goodwin, Gordon (1889). "Elizabeth (1635-1650)" . In Stephen, Leslie (ed.). Dictionary of National Biography. Vol. 17. London: Smith, Elder & Co. pp. 232–233.
- Goodwin, Gordon (1893). "Mary (1631-1660)" . In Lee, Sidney (ed.). Dictionary of National Biography. Vol. 36. London: Smith, Elder & Co. pp. 108–109.
- Henderson, Thomas Finlayson (1891). "Henry (1639-1660)" . In Stephen, Leslie; Lee, Sidney (eds.). Dictionary of National Biography. Vol. 26. London: Smith, Elder & Co. pp. 108–109.
- Kitson, Frank (1999). Prince Rupert: Admiral and General-at-Sea. London: Constable. ISBN 978-0-0947-9850-2.
- Louda, Jiří; Maclagan, Michael (1999) [1981], Lines of Succession: Heraldry of the Royal Families of Europe (2nd ed.), London: Little, Brown, ISBN 978-0-3168-4820-6
- Miller, John (2008). James II. New Haven: Yale University Press. pp. 37–66. ISBN 978-0-3001-4341-6.
- Panton, James (2011). Historical Dictionary of the British Monarchy. Scarecrow Press. ISBN 978-0-8108-7497-8.
- Purkiss, Diane (2012). The English Civil War: A People's History. London: Harper-Collins, UK. ISBN 978-0-0073-6911-9.
- Waller, Maureen (2007). Ungrateful Daughters: The Stuart Princesses Who Stole Their Father's Crown. Macmillan. pp. 49–135. ISBN 978-1-4299-8209-2.
- Weir, Alison (2011). Britain's Royal Families: The Complete Genealogy. Random House. ISBN 978-1-4464-4911-0.
- White, Michelle A. (2006). Henrietta Maria and the English Civil Wars. Ashgate Publishing. ISBN 978-0-7546-3942-8.
