= Eva Marie Veigel =

Austrian dancer

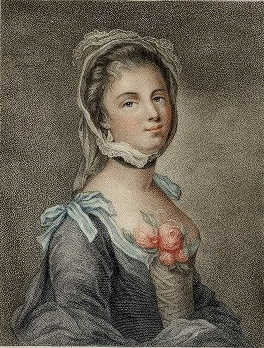
- picture by Catherine Reid, engraved by W. P. Sherlock, 1802
- Born: 29 February 1724
- Died: 16 October 1822 (aged 98)
- Resting place: Westminster Abbey
- Occupation: Dancer
- Spouse: David Garrick

Eva Marie Veigel (also Eva Maria Violette, with variants Eva Maria and Ava-Maria; 29 February 1724 – 16 October 1822) was a dancer and the wife of actor David Garrick.

== Life ==
Eva Marie Veigel was born in Vienna. She was a well-known dancer of her day, using the stage name Violette or Violetti, said to be a nickname given to her by Empress Maria Theresa based on the meaning of her surname—a corruption from the Middle High German viol, "violet."

As Chester says, "Nothing appears to be absolutely known concerning her origin." There is some doubt as to her paternity, with some saying she was the daughter of a respectable Viennese businessman named John Veigel; but Veigel and her husband were known to say she was of noble paternity. Guido Wald Rüdiger, Count of Starhemberg and Richard Boyle, the Earl of Burlington are thought the most likely candidates if this claim is true. Boyle was reported to have given £6,000 as a marriage portion and to have acknowledged her as a natural daughter. She had a brother, Ferdinand Charles, who was also a ballet dancer.

One French biography of her life claimed she was known to be one of the most beautiful women in all of Europe. She emigrated to London in 1746, speaking little English. It is rumored that the Empress sent her there as a banishment, after noticing the Emperor taking too great a fancy to her for her beauty, though this story is often thought unlikely.

== Marriage ==
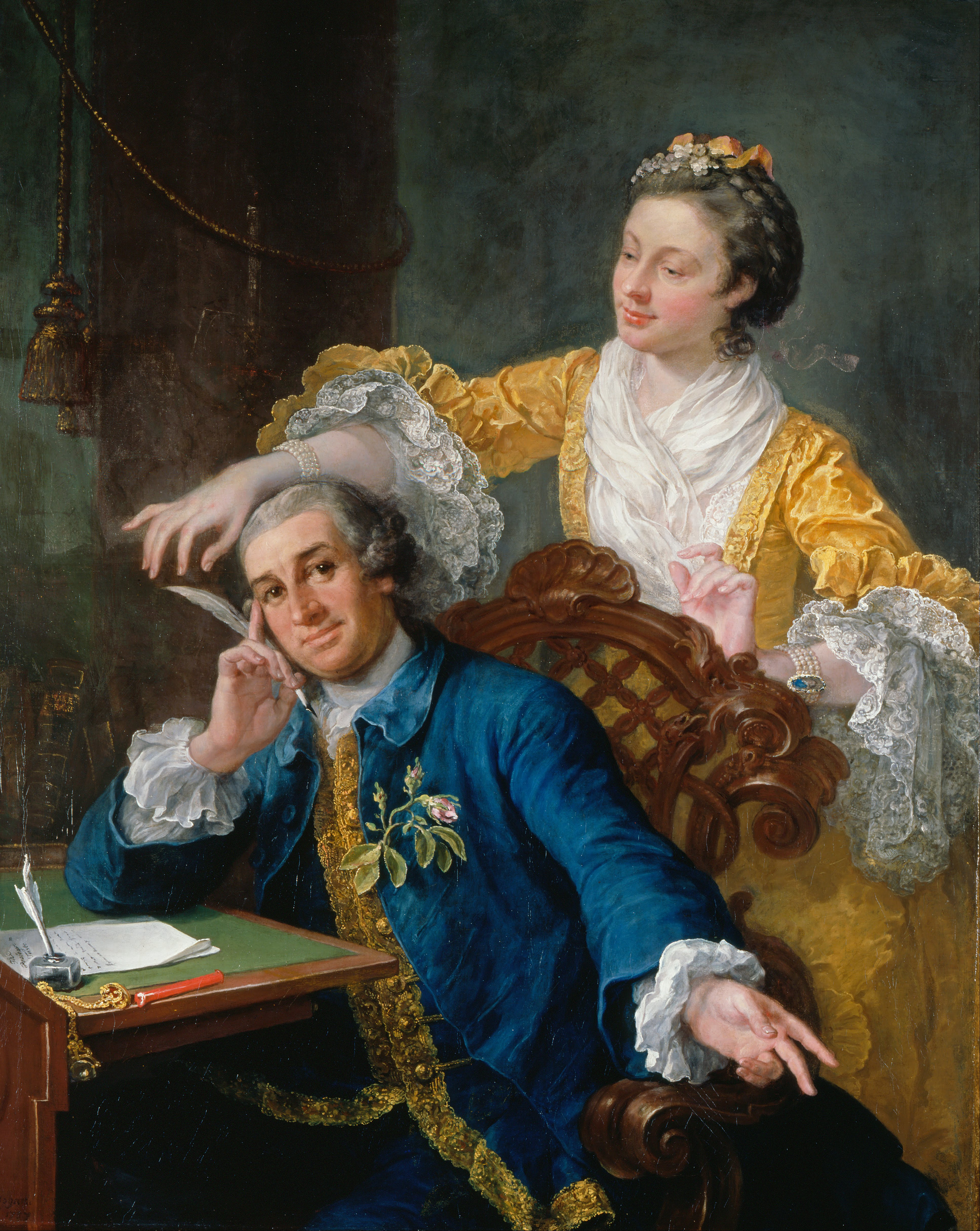
Eva Marie Veigel and husband David Garrick, painted by William Hogarth. The painting is in the Royal Collection at Windsor Castle.

Veigel married David Garrick on 22 June 1749. As she was a Catholic and he a Protestant, the couple went through two marriage ceremonies. According to Bailey, Veigel first fell in love with Garrick after seeing him perform on the stage, and their respective entertainment careers caused them to meet socially soon thereafter.

He was taken with her just as quickly, but her wealthy patron, Dorothy Boyle, the Countess of Burlington (wife of the 3rd Earl of Burlington), discouraged her from marrying him as Veigel had performed in the royal courts of Europe and Garrick was seen as being a match much beneath her. Reportedly the Countess asked Garrick to use his performance abilities to make Veigel fall out of love with him, which he did attempt. The scheme did not work, but Burlington was nevertheless impressed enough with the effort that she changed her opinion of Garrick and decided Veigel would be well to marry him. This reported incident may have been the inspiration for such plays as Robertson's David Garrick.

By all accounts, the match between Garrick and Veigel was a happy one. They were childless, and Veigel outlived her husband by forty-three years. On marrying, she retired from dancing. Garrick's increasing wealth enabled him to purchase a palatial estate for Eva Marie and himself to live in, naming it Garrick's Villa, that he bought at Hampton in 1754.

At the time of her death, she was living at Adelphi Terrace, in London's borough of Westminster. Her will, dated 28 January 1819, with codicils of 28 November 1821 and 15 August 1822, was proved on 30 October 1822. The only relations of her own whom she named were her niece Elizabeth, wife of Mr. Peter de Saar, of Vienna; and her god-daughter Eva-Maria de Saar, daughter of her late nephew Louis de Saar, of Oldenburgh, in Hungary. She reportedly lived to 99 years of age, though her stated birthdate of leap-year's day would make her 98 at the time of her death. She was buried in Westminster Abbey with her husband.

== Sources ==
- Percy Hetherington Fitzgerald, The Life of David Garrick
- John Burn Bailey, Modern Methuselahs
- Joseph Lemuel Chester, The Marriage, Baptismal and Burial Registers of the Collegiate Church
- Encyclopædia Britannica
- https://web.archive.org/web/20071117093640/http://www.familyeducation.com/home/
- Talia Felix and T.W. Robertson, David Garrick: The Play and the Novel
