= Anne Stuart (daughter of Charles I) =

English and Scottish princess (1637–1640)

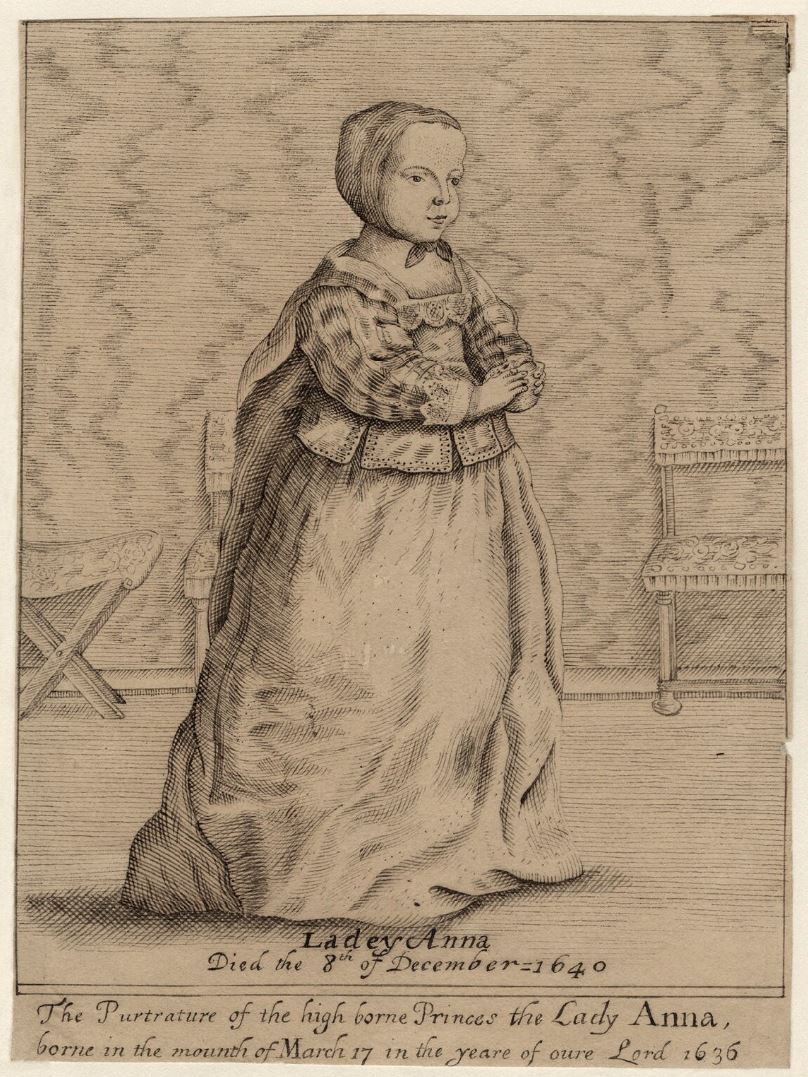
- Princess Anne c. 1639
- Born: 17 March 1637; St. James's Palace, London, England
- Died: 5 November 1640 (aged 3); Richmond Palace, London, England
- Burial: 8 December 1640 (Note: Some sources place her death on this day, e.g. Chester, Joseph Lemuel (editor) (1876). The Marriage, Baptismal, and Burial Registers of the Collegiate Church or Abbey of St. Peter, Westminster. Page 134. London: Harleian Society.); Westminster Abbey
- House: Stuart
- Father: Charles I
- Mother: Henrietta Maria of France

Anne Stuart (17 March 1637 – 5 November 1640) was the daughter of King Charles I and Henrietta Maria of France. She was one of the couple's three children to die in childhood.

== Biography ==
=== Life ===
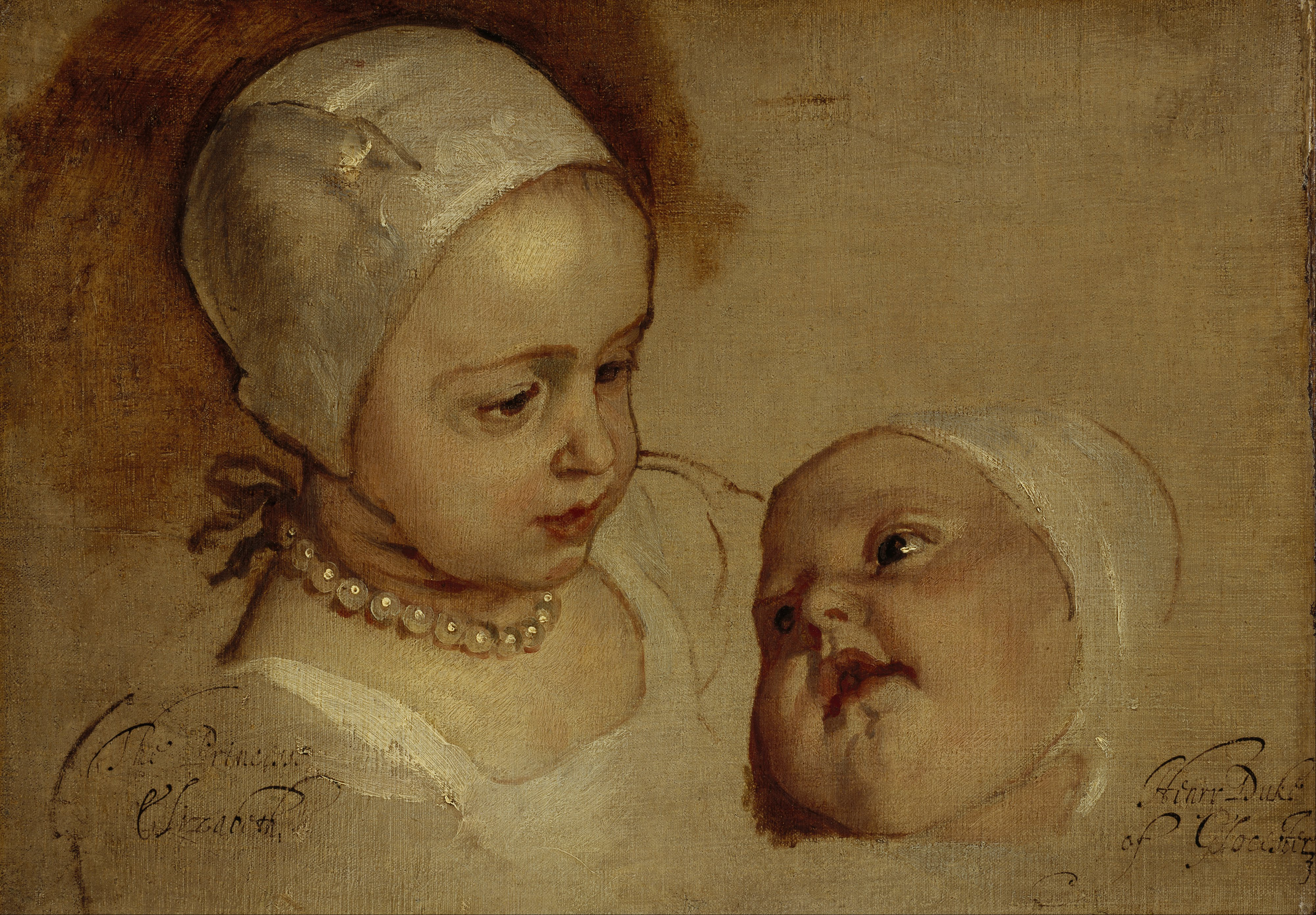
Anne (right) with her sister Elizabeth in 1637, by Anthony van Dyck

Anne was born on 17 March 1637 at St. James's Palace, the sixth child and third daughter of King Charles I of England and his queen, Henrietta Maria of France. Her siblings were, in order of birth: Charles James, Duke of Rothesay and Cornwall (13 May 1629); the future Charles II of England; Mary, Princess Royal and future Princess of Orange; the future James II of England and Elizabeth of England. Anne was baptised an Anglican at St. James's Palace on 30 March, by William Laud, the Anglican Archbishop of Canterbury. Anne only lived to see the birth of two siblings: the short lived Catherine (29 June 1639) and Henry Stuart, Duke of Gloucester. She died before the birth of her sister, Princess Henrietta of England, who married Philippe I, Duke of Orléans and had four children by him.

=== Death ===
Aged just three, Anne died in 1640 from the lung disease tuberculosis. She was buried in Westminster Abbey, next to her brother Charles James.

== Ancestors ==
Ancestors of Anne Stuart (daughter of Charles I)

8. Henry Stuart, Lord Darnley
4. James I of England (VI of Scotland)
9. Mary, Queen of Scots
2. Charles I of England
10. Frederick II of Denmark
5. Anne of Denmark
11. Sophia of Mecklenburg
1. Princess Anne
12. Anthony, Duke of Vendôme
6. Henry IV of France
13. Joan III of Navarre
3. Henrietta Maria of France
14. Francis I de' Medici, Grand Duke of Tuscany
7. Marie de' Medici
15. Joanna of Austria
