= Arundel, Coburg =

House in Melbourne, Victoria, Australia

Arundel
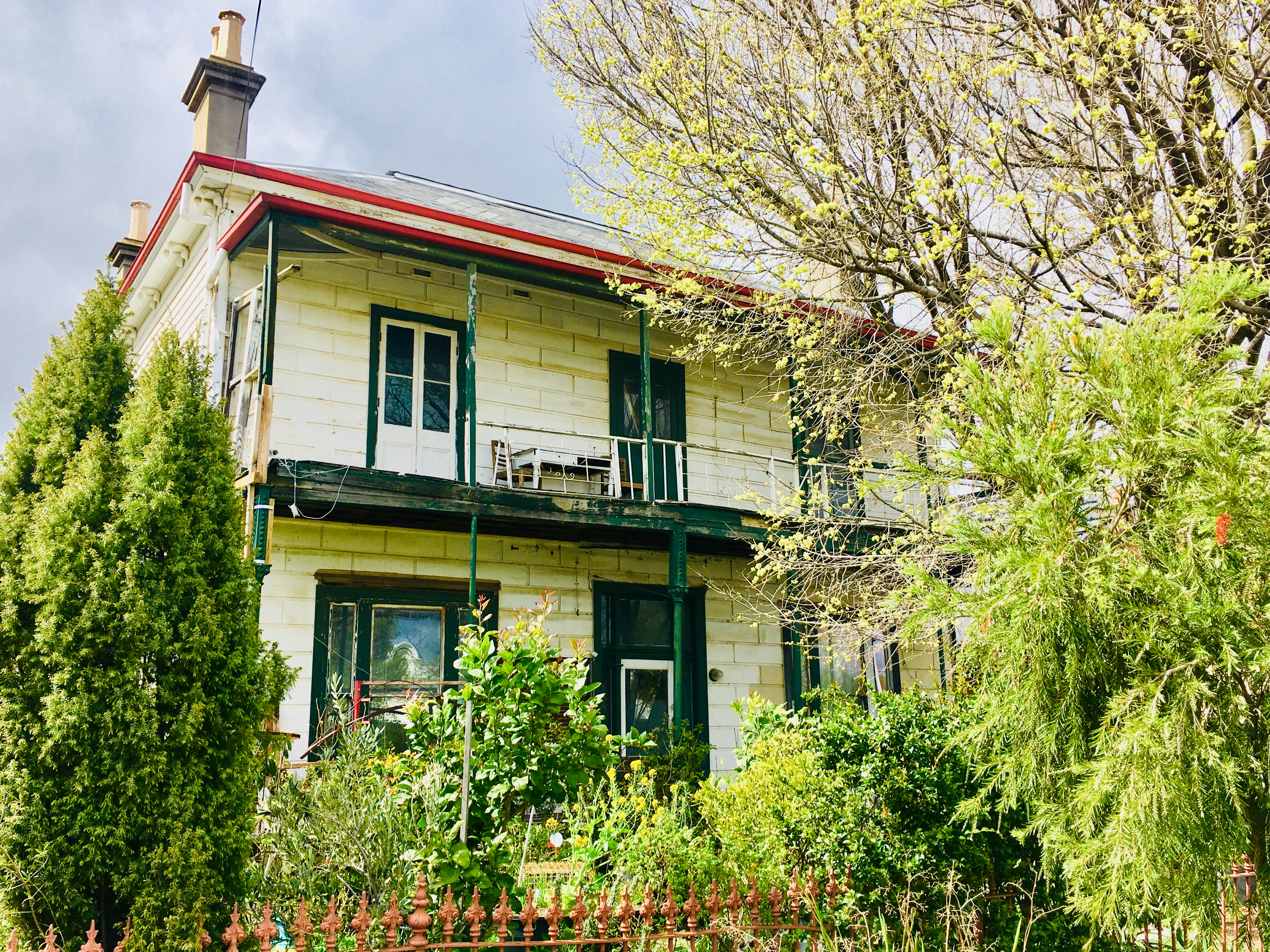
- Photograph taken in 2019

- Location within Melbourne
- Former names: Arundel House
- Etymology: Arundel Wrighte (early settler)

General information
- Status: Completed
- Type: House / Boarding house
- Location: 42A Ross Street, Coburg, Melbourne, Victoria, Australia
- Coordinates: 37°44′18″S 144°57′59″E
- Completed: 1889; 137 years ago
- Client: Arthur Gravatt

Technical details
- Material: Timber weatherboard; slate
- Floor count: 2

Victorian Heritage Register
- Official name: Arundel
- Type: Registered place
- Designated: 13 September 2001
- Reference no.: H1948
- Heritage overlay no.: HO242
- Category: Residential buildings (private)

Arundel is a house at 42A (Note: Originally 42 Ross Street. However, the lot was subsequently subdivided and this heritage-listed site now occupies what is called 42A Ross Street, with 42 Ross Street containing a single-storey dwelling.) Ross Street in Coburg, an inner-northern suburb of Melbourne, Australia. Completed in 1889, the house was built as a boarding house for warders at the nearby HM Prison Pentridge, as it was close enough for warders to hear the prison bell for the change of shifts.

Since repurposed and subdivided, the house was added to the Victorian Heritage Register on 13 September 2001 in recognition of its historic, architectural, social and cultural significance. The house was also added to non-statutory lists by the Victorian branch of the National Trust on 2 April 2001 and the City of Merri-bek on an unknown date.

It is most likely that the house was named in honour of Arundel Wrighte, an early settler in the region.

== History ==
The area once called Dean's Paddock was originally owned by Roman Catholic priest Rev. Charles O'Hea after whom O'Hea Street is named. O'Hea subdivided the estate and, in 1888, Arthur Gravatt purchased several 2-hectare (5-acre) blocks of land including the vacant lot on which Arundel stands. He built the house in c. 1889. From 1886, the titles were held by the Australian Deposit Mortgage Bank and for many years until after 1910 (at least for No. 42) it is shown in the rate books that Gravatt was the owner.

Between c. 1896 and c. 1898, it was operated by the wife of John Barclay, a warder in charge of rosters at the prison; and it had various other owners and operators. After the turn of the 20th century, warders were permitted to live at a greater distance and Arundel ceased use as a boarding house for wardens. The prison closed in 1997.

In July 2000, a new owner planned to build houses on either side of Arundel and subdivide the whole allotment. From that time, there was pressure to add the structure to a statutory heritage register. The new dwellings were constructed and Arundel was vacated and the house fell into disrepair. Added to the Victorian Heritage Register in 2001, the house was listed for sale and purchased by Margaret Rouse, who intended to reside and restore Arundel.

== Description ==
Arundel is a relatively rare two-storey timber weatherboard residential building with slate roof, and is the only of its type built in Coburg. The size and layout of the rooms suggest it was specifically designed as a boarding house, and the name Arundel House first appeared in a 1901 directory listing. Contemporary directories indicate it was used as a boarding house. It is believed that over a long period warders from the nearby Pentridge gaol boarded at Arundel House, because they were required to live within earshot of the prison bell.

Arundel House is historically important as a privately operated residential facility which had an association with Pentridge prison, the flagship of all Victorian penal institutions, through its role as a boarding house occupied by warders over a long period.

Historically, boarding houses were predominantly designed for young single men, whereas today, boarding houses are more commonly occupied by elderly single people.

As of September 2001, most of the original interior fittings, such as fireplaces, ceiling roses, staircase and gaslight connections, were intact.

== See also ==
- Architecture of Melbourne
- List of places on the Victorian Heritage Register in the City of Merri-bek
