= Thomas Arundel (disambiguation) =

Thomas Arundel (1353–1414) was archbishop of Canterbury and opponent of the Lollards.

Thomas Arundel or Arundell may also refer to:

- Thomas Fitzalan, 5th Earl of Arundel (1381–1415), English nobleman, opponent of King Richard II
- Thomas Arundell (MP died 1443), MP for Cornwall
- Sir Thomas Arundell (1454–1485), English nobleman
- Thomas Arundell of Wardour Castle (c. 1502–1552), English courtier
- Thomas Arundell, 1st Baron Arundell of Wardour (c. 1560–1639)
- Thomas Arundell, 2nd Baron Arundell of Wardour (c. 1586–1643), English nobleman
- Thomas Arundell (of Duloe) (died 1648), English politician
