= Arundell =

Arundell may refer to:

- Anne Arundell (1615–1649), Baroness Baltimore and namesake of Anne Arundel County, Maryland
- Arundell Esdaile (1880–1956), British librarian, Secretary to the British Museum
- Arundell family, notable Cornish family
- Baron Arundell of Trerice
- Baron Arundell of Wardour
- C. Rogers Arundell (1885–1968), American judge
- Dennis Arundell (1898–1988), English actor, librettist, opera scholar, translator, producer, director, conductor and composer of incidental music
- Francis Vyvyan Jago Arundell (1780–1846), English antiquary and oriental traveller
- Humphrey Arundell (c.1513–1550), leader of the Cornish rebellion of 1549
- Sir John Arundell of Lanherne (died 1379), English naval commander
- Peter Arundell (1933–2009), British motor racing driver

== See also ==
- Arundel (disambiguation)
