= Anthony Mildmay (courtier) =

Anthony Mildmay was an English courtier and politician who sat in the House of Commons in 1640. He waited on King Charles during his imprisonment and had care of two of his children after the King's execution.

Mildmay was the son of Sir Humphrey Mildmay of Danbury Essex. He was awarded MA at Cambridge University on the visit of the King in 1624. He was a royal courtier and was gentleman usher and carver to King Charles I.

In April 1640, Mildmay was elected Member of Parliament for West Looe in the Short Parliament.

Mildmay waited on King Charles during his imprisonment, and after the execution in 1649 conveyed the body of the King to Windsor. He was responsible escorting the King's children Henry, Duke of Gloucester and Princess Elizabeth to Carisbrooke Castle where Elizabeth died in 1650 and Henry stayed until he went abroad in 1652.

Mildmay was the brother of Henry Mildmay, Master of the Jewel Office and later a Parliamentarian.

Parliament of England
Vacant Parliament suspended since 1629	Member of Parliament for West Looe; 1640; With: George Potter	Succeeded by Henry Killigrew; Thomas Arundell
