= Elizabeth Stuart (daughter of Charles I) =

English and Scottish princess (1635–1650)

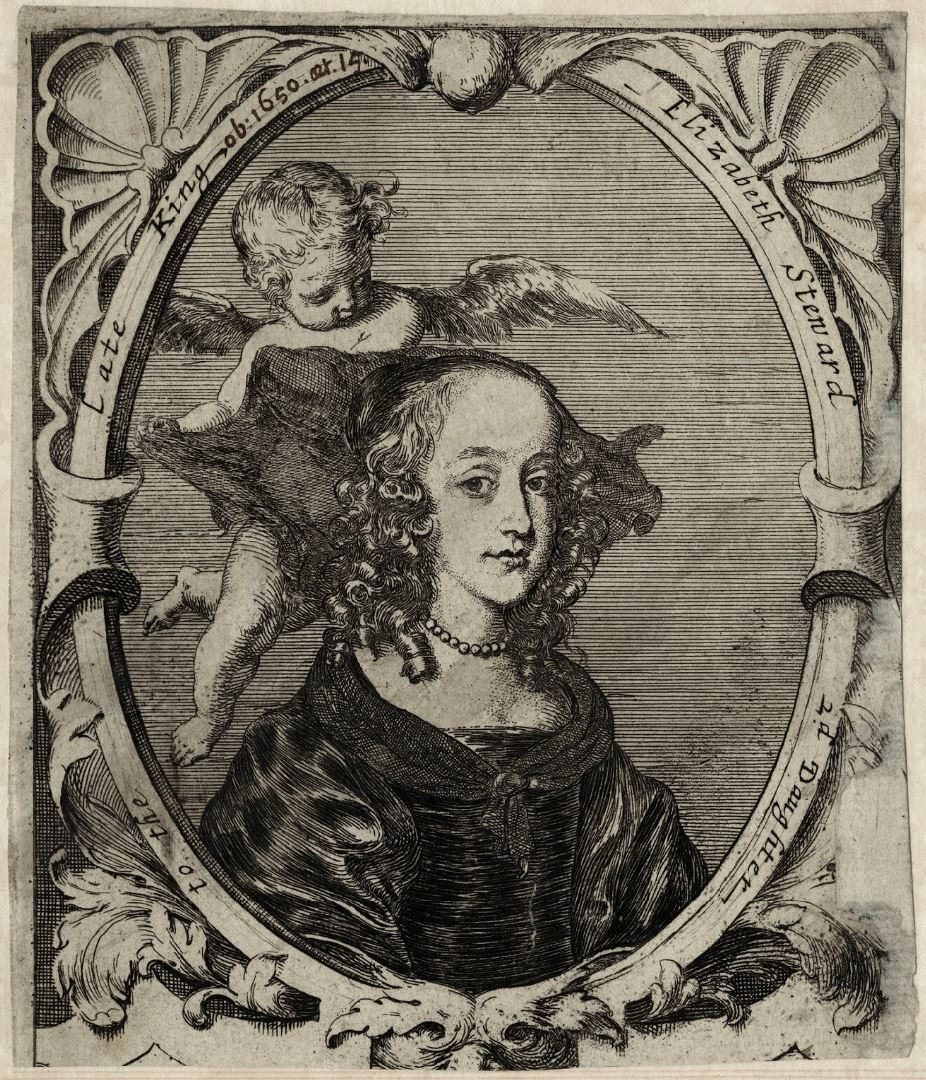
- Princess Elizabeth in 1649
- Born: 28 December 1635; St. James's Palace, London, England
- Died: 8 September 1650 (aged 14); Carisbrooke Castle, Isle of Wight, England
- Burial: 24 September 1650; St. Thomas's Church, Newport, Isle of Wight
- House: Stuart
- Father: Charles I of England
- Mother: Henrietta Maria of France

Elizabeth Stuart (28 December 1635 – 8 September 1650) was the second daughter of Charles I, King of England, Scotland and Ireland, and Henrietta Maria of France.

From age six until her death at age 14, Elizabeth was a prisoner of the English Parliament during the English Civil War. Her emotional written account of her final meeting with her father on the eve of his execution and his final words to his children have been published in numerous histories about the Civil War and Charles I.

== Failed betrothal ==
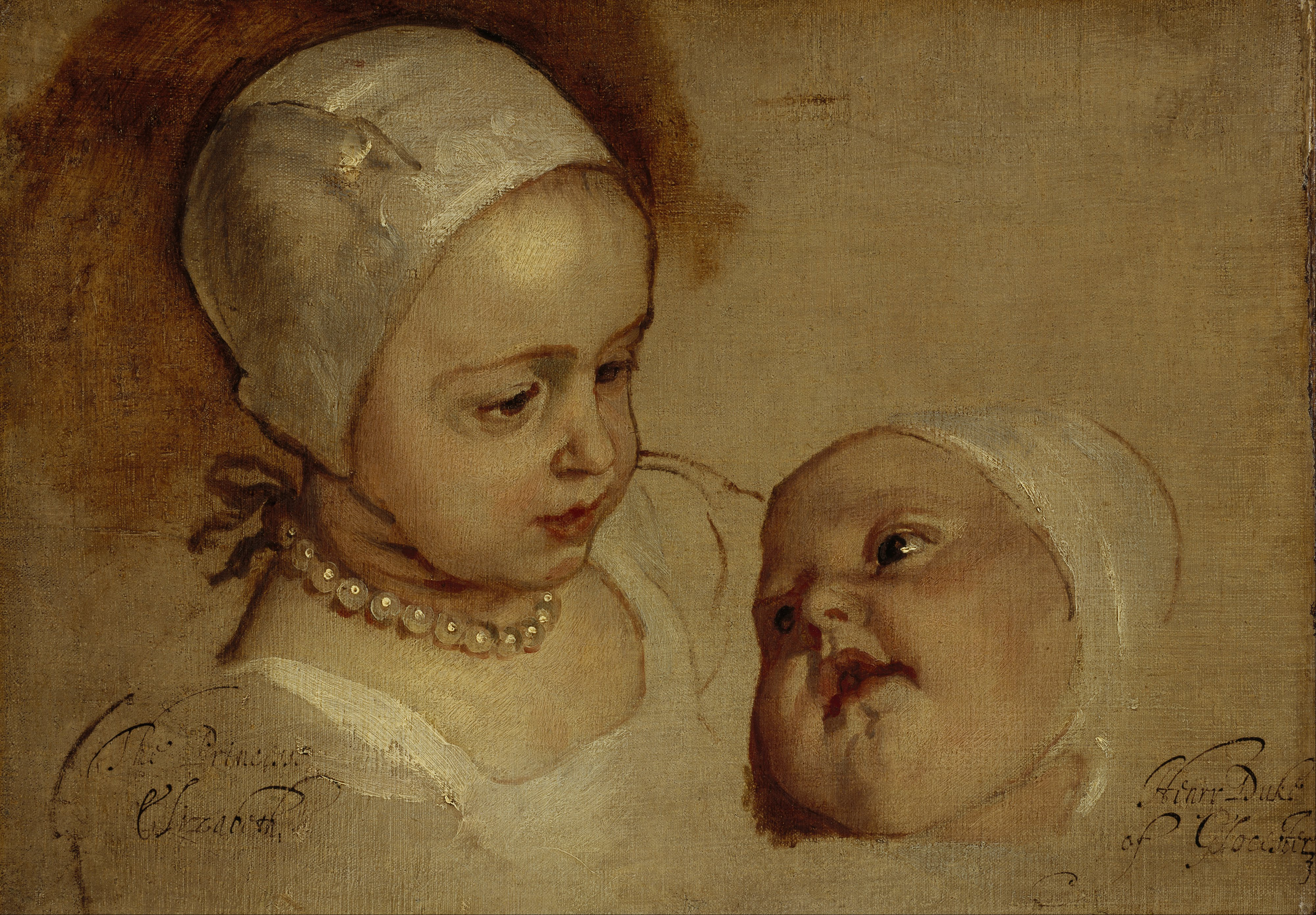
Elizabeth holding her sister Anne, painted by van Dyck

Elizabeth was born on 28 December 1635 at St James's Palace and was baptised there five days later, on 2 January, by William Laud, Archbishop of Canterbury.

In 1636, Maria de' Medici, Elizabeth's maternal grandmother, attempted to have the infant princess betrothed to the son of the Prince of Orange, the future William II of Orange. Despite the fact that Charles I thought the marriage of an English princess to a Prince of Orange beneath her rank, the king's financial and political troubles forced him to send Elizabeth's sister, Mary, Princess Royal, to marry him instead.

== Civil war ==
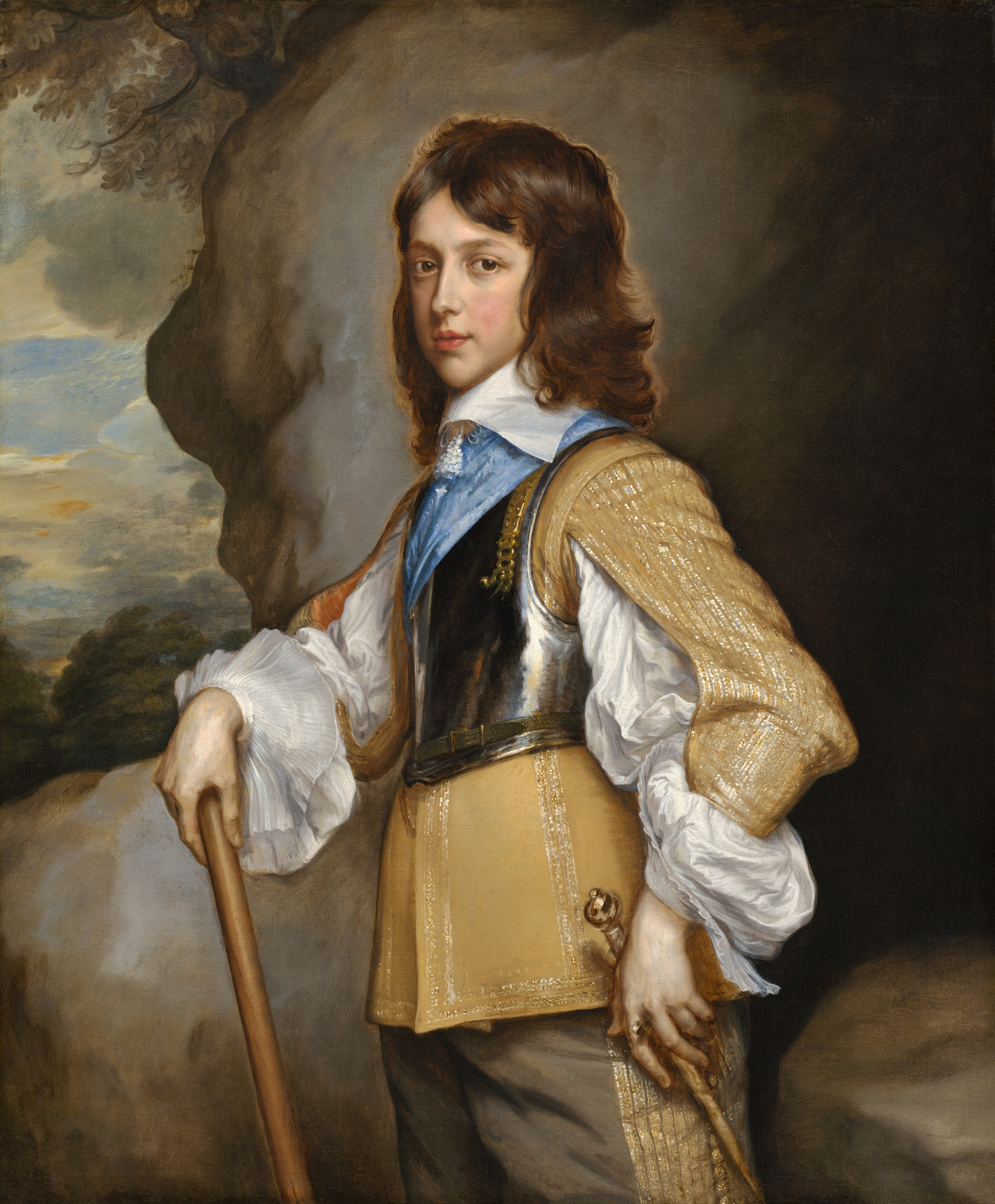
Elizabeth's younger brother, Henry Stuart, Duke of Gloucester, painted in 1653 by Adriaen Hanneman

On the outbreak of the English Civil War in 1642, Elizabeth, and her brother, the Duke of Gloucester, were placed under the care of Parliament. Over the coming years, Parliament assigned their guardianships to several nobles, among them Philip Herbert, 4th Earl of Pembroke.

In 1642, Parliament assigned guardianship of Elizabeth and Henry to the Earl of Northumberland. That same year, their brother, James, Duke of York, the future James II, came to visit them. However, Elizabeth supposedly advised him to leave out of concern about their enemies.

In 1643, the seven-year-old Elizabeth broke her leg. That same year, she and Henry moved to Chelsea. She was tutored by Bathsua Makin until 1644. By then, Elizabeth could read and write in Hebrew, Greek, Italian, Latin and French. Other prominent scholars dedicated works to her, and were amazed by her flair for religious reading.

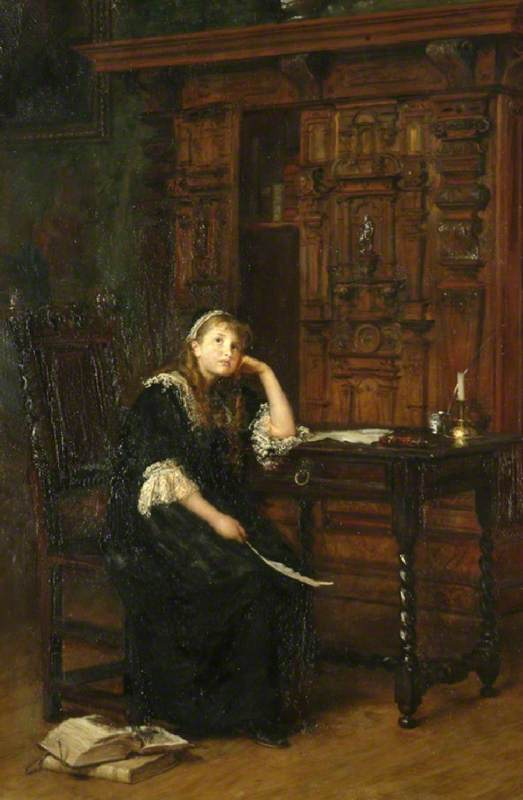
Princess Elizabeth in Prison at St James's by John Everett Millais, 1879

In 1647, Parliament allowed Elizabeth and her brothers Henry and James to travel to Maidenhead to meet their father Charles I and spend two days with him. After the Parliament moved Charles I to Hampton Court Palace, he visited his children under the care of the Northumberlands at Syon House. These visits ended when he fled to Carisbrooke Castle on the Isle of Wight; ten-year-old Elizabeth supposedly helped James to escape once again, dressed as a woman.

Elizabeth suffered from poor health. A Victorian-era examination of her remains revealed that she had suffered from rickets, which caused shoulder and back deformities, knock knees and pigeon toes. These problems would have made it difficult for Elizabeth to walk. The adolescent Elizabeth had a long face with a protruding jaw and reddish-brown hair.

When Parliament decided to remove Elizabeth's household in 1648, the 12-year-old princess wrote them a letter protesting their decision: "My Lords, I account myself very miserable that I must have my servants taken from me and strangers put to me. You promised me that you would have a care for me; and I hope you will show it in preventing so great a grief as this would be to me. I pray my lords consider of it, and give me cause to thank you, and to rest. Your loving friend, Elizabeth." The Lords were sympathetic to Elizabeth's plight and condemned the Commons for intervening with the Royal Household, and overturned the decision. However, the Commons demanded that the royal children be brought up as strict Protestants; they were also forbidden to join the Court at Oxford, and were held virtual prisoners at St. James's Palace. At one point, Parliament considered making Henry a replacement king, but strictly a constitutional monarch.

== Execution of Charles I ==
In 1649, Charles I was captured for the final time. Oliver Cromwell and the other judges immediately sentenced him to death. Elizabeth wrote a long letter to Parliament requesting permission to join her sister Mary in Holland. However, Parliament refused to grant this request until after the execution.

On 29 January 1649, thirteen-year-old Elizabeth and Henry met with their father for the last time. She wrote an account of the meeting: "He told me he was glad I was come, and although he had not time to say much, yet somewhat he had to say to me which he had not to another, or leave in writing, because he feared their cruelty was such as that they would not have permitted him to write to me.

"Elizabeth was reportedly crying so hard that Charles I asked her if she would be able to remember everything he told her. She promised never to forget and said she would record it in writing. She wrote two separate accounts of the meeting. Her father told her not to "grieve and torment herself for him" and asked her to keep her faith in the Protestant religion. Charles I told her to read certain books, among them Bishop Andrew's Sermons, Hooker's Ecclesiastical Polity and Bishop Laud's book against Fisher, to ground her against "popery".

He bid us tell my mother that his thoughts had never strayed from her, and that his love would be the same to the last. Withal, he commanded me and my brother to be obedient to her; and bid me send his blessing to the rest of my brothers and sisters, with communications to all his friends. Then, taking my brother Gloucester on his knee, he said, 'Sweetheart, now they will cut off thy father's head.' And Gloucester looking very intently upon him, he said again, "Heed, my child, what I say: they will cut off my head and perhaps make thee a king. But mark what I say. Thou must not be a king as long as thy brothers Charles and James do live; for they will cut off your brothers' heads when they can catch them, and cut off thy head too at the last, and therefore I charge you, do not be made a king by them.' At which my brother sighed deeply, and made answer: 'I will be torn in pieces first!' And these words, coming so unexpectedly from so young a child, rejoiced my father exceedingly. And his majesty spoke to him of the welfare of his soul, and to keep his religion, commanding him to fear God, and He would provide for him. Further, he commanded us all to forgive those people, but never to trust them; for they had been most false to him and those that gave them power, and he feared also to their own souls. And he desired me not to grieve for him, for he should die a martyr, and that he doubted not the Lord would settle his throne upon his son, and that we all should be happier than we could have expected to have been if he had lived; with many other things which at present I cannot remember.

After the death of Charles I, Elizabeth and Henry became unwanted charges. Joceline, Lord Lisle, the Earl of Northumberland's son, petitioned Parliament to remove Elizabeth and Henry from the Northumberlands' care. Parliament refused to allow them to go to Holland, and instead placed the children in the care of Sir Edward Harrington; however, Harrington's son successfully pleaded that they be looked after elsewhere.

== Commonwealth ==
The next residence for Elizabeth and Henry was Penshurst Place, under the care of Robert Sidney, 2nd Earl of Leicester, and his wife Dorothy. Parliament had instructed the Sidneys not to spoil the children. However, Dorothy Sidney treated Elizabeth with great kindness; as a token of her appreciation, Elizabeth gave Dorothy a jewel from her own collection. The valuable jewel later became the centre of conflict between Dorothy and the Parliamentary commissioners appointed to oversee the late king's personal estate.

In 1650, Elizabeth's brother, the now titular Charles II, journeyed to Scotland to be crowned king of that country. In response, Parliament moved Elizabeth to the Isle of Wight in the care of Anthony Mildmay with a pension of £3000 a year. Elizabeth complained that she was not well enough to travel, but her concerns were ignored.

== Death ==
During the move to the Isle of Wight, Elizabeth caught a cold that quickly developed into pneumonia. She died on 8 September 1650, at Carisbrooke Castle.

She was buried at St. Thomas's Church, Newport, on the Isle of Wight. Elizabeth's grave stone was only marked with the initials "ES" for Elizabeth Stuart.

Two hundred years later, Queen Victoria, who had settled at Osborne House nearby, commissioned a white marble sculpture of Elizabeth by the sculptor Carlo Marochetti. The sculpture depicts Elizabeth as a beautiful young woman, lying with her cheek on a Bible. The Bible is open to words from the Gospel of Matthew: "Come unto me all of you who are heavy laden and I will refresh you". The plaque on the sculpture reads: "To the memory of The Princess Elizabeth, daughter of King Charles I, who died at Carisbrooke Castle on 8 September 1650, and is interred beneath the chancel of this church, this monument is erected as a token of respect for her virtues and of sympathy for her misfortunes, by Victoria R., 1856."

The concluding lines from The Death of The Princess Elizabeth in the 1866 book Lays of the English Cavaliers by John Jeremiah Daniel commemorated Victoria's actions:

And long unknown, unhonoured, her sacred dust had slept

When to the Stuart maiden's grave a mourner came and wept.
Go, read that Royal Martyr's woe in lines the world reveres

And see the tomb of Charles's child wet with Victoria's tears."

== Ancestors ==
Ancestors of Elizabeth Stuart (daughter of Charles I)

8. Henry Stuart, Lord Darnley
4. James I of England (VI of Scotland)
9. Mary, Queen of Scots
2. Charles I of England
10. Frederick II of Denmark
5. Anne of Denmark
11. Sophia of Mecklenburg
1. Elizabeth Stuart
12. Anthony, Duke of Vendôme
6. Henry IV of France
13. Joan III of Navarre
3. Henrietta Maria of France
14. Francis I de' Medici, Grand Duke of Tuscany
7. Marie de' Medici
15. Joanna of Austria
