= Thomas Arundell (of Duloe) =

English politician

Thomas Arundell (died 1648) was an English politician who sat in the House of Commons from 1640 to 1648.

Arundell was the son of John Arundell of Trerice, Cornwall, and his wife Gertrude Dennys, daughter of Sir Robert Dennys of Holcombe. He inherited property at Duloe (including Trenant Park) from his father and extended these properties with further additions. On 30 May 1614, he was granted all that parcel, quantity of ground, oze, or water, now surrounded by the said millpool-wall, to hold for 500 years, and afterwards built a millhouse, the mill-pool-wall, four grist-mills, and other houses.

In his 'Survey of Cornwall' Richard Carew (Arundell's brother in law) reveals that he was a soldier; "(he) followeth the Netherland wars, with so well-liked a carriage, that he outgoeth his age, and time of service, in preferment."

In November 1640, Arundell was elected Member of Parliament for West Looe in the Long Parliament. Unlike his Royalist cousins he remained in parliament until his death in 1648.

== Marriage and issue ==
Arundell married Mary Capell, daughter of Sir Gamaliel Capell

- Gertrude Arundell

Mary (Marie) died on 8 May 1623 and was buried at Newlyn East. Their daughter Gertrude is named in Thomas' will as Gartred (sic) Meech widow.

His second wife (married 21 June 1624 at Morwenstow in Cornwall) was Julian Cary the daughter of George Cary Esq and Catherine (nee Russell) of Clovelly in Devon. They had issue including a son John who succeeded his father at Duloe and a son Francis.

Arundell made his will on 3 November 1648 and he was buried on 7 November 1648 in the quire of Westminster Abbey as "Thomas Arundell Esq a Member of the House of Commons."

Parliament of England
Preceded by Anthony Mildmay; George Potter	Member of Parliament for West Looe; 1640–1648; With: Henry Killigrew 1640–1644	Succeeded by John Arundell
