= John Miller (historian) =

John Miller (born 5 July 1946) is a British historian of the seventeenth century, with particular focus on the reigns of Charles II and James II and the Glorious Revolution. He was a professor at Queen Mary University of London.

== Works ==
=== Books ===
- Popery and Politics in England 1660–1688 (Cambridge: Cambridge University Press, 1973). ISBN 0521202361
- The Life and Times of William and Mary (London: Weidenfeld and Nicolson, 1974). ISBN 0297767607
- James II: A Study in Kingship (London: Wayland Publishers, 1978; Methuen, 2nd ed. 1989). ISBN 085340058X, ISBN 0413623408
- The Glorious Revolution (London: Longman, 1983; 2nd ed. 1997). ISBN 0582353661, ISBN 0582292220
- Restoration England: The Reign of Charles II (London: Longman Higher Education, 1985). ISBN 0582353963
- Religion in the Popular Prints 1600–1832 (Cambridge: Chadwick-Healey, 1986). ISBN 0859641708
- Bourbon and Stuart: Kings and Kingship in France and England in the Seventeenth Century (London: Franklin Watts, 1987). ISBN 0531150526
- Seeds of Liberty: 1688 and the Shaping of Modern Britain (London: Souvenir Press, 1988). ISBN 0285628399
- Absolutism in Seventeenth Century Europe, ed. John Miller (Basingstoke: Palgrave Macmillan, 1990). ISBN 0333461134
- Charles II (London: Weidenfeld and Nicolson, 1991). ISBN 0297812149
- An English Absolutism? The Later Stuart Monarchy 1660–88 (The Historical Association, 1993). ISBN 0852783353
- After the Civil Wars: English Politics and Government in the Reign of Charles II (London: Longman, 2000). ISBN 0582298997
- The Stuarts (London: Hambledon Continuum, 2003). ISBN 1852854324
- Cities Divided: Politics and Religion in English Provincial Towns 1660–1722 (Oxford: Oxford University Press, 2007). ISBN 0199288399
- A Brief History of the English Civil Wars (Brief Histories): Roundheads, Cavaliers and the Execution of the King (London: Robinson, 2009). ISBN 1845296834
- Early Modern Britain 1450–1750 (Cambridge: Cambridge University Press, 2017). ISBN 1107015111

=== Articles ===
- 'The Earl of Tyrconnel and James II's Irish Policy, 1685–1688', The Historical Journal, Vol. 20, No. 4 (December 1977), pp. 803-823.
- 'The Potential for ‘Absolutism’ in Later Stuart England', History, Vol. 69, No. 226 (1984), pp. 187-207.
- 'The Crown and the Borough Charters in the Reign of Charles II', The English Historical Review, Vol. 100, No. 394 (January 1985), pp. 53-84.
- 'Public Opinion in Charles II's England', History, Vol. 80, No. 260 (October 1995), pp. 359-381.
- 'A Moderate in the First Age of Party: The Dilemmas of Sir John Holland, 1675–85', The English Historical Review, Vol. 114, No. 458 (September 1999), pp. 844-874.
- '‘A Suffering People’: English Quakers and Their Neighbours c. 1650–c. 1700', Past & Present, No. 188 (August 2005), pp. 71-103.
- 'Containing Division in Restoration Norwich', The English Historical Review, Vol. 121, No. 493 (September 2006), pp. 1019-1047.
