= Arundel Wrighte =

Settler of Tasmania and Melbourne

Arundel Wrighte (1804–1887) was a colonist, first Postmaster of Launceston in Van Diemen's Land and founder of Box Hill, Victoria. Arundel Wrighte first settled with his wife (née Upton) and family in Van Diemen's Land, where he was the first Postmaster of Launceston and was engaged in various business and pastoral pursuits.

He was one of the first unauthorized colonists in Melbourne and built a weatherboard home on the eastern side of the future city, despite warnings that he would have to move. For nearly three years he waged a successful war of manoeuvre against the Superintendent Charles La Trobe, appealing over La Trobe's head to Governor Richard Bourke in Sydney, Wrighte managed to thwart La Trobe's efforts to evict him for much longer than should have been the case.

In 1838, Wrighte founded Box Hill by establishing his pastoral run, "Marionvale". The stones from his original homestead now form the Pioneers' Memorial outside the town hall.

Wrighte also had pastoral interests in New South Wales.
