= Joseph Lemuel Chester =

American genealogist, poet and editor

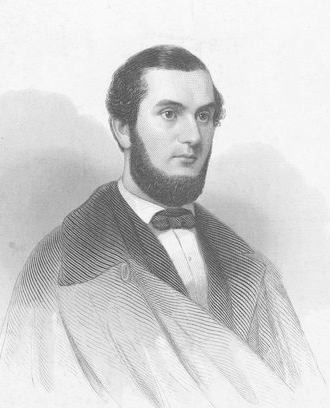
- Born: April 30, 1821; Norwich, Connecticut
- Died: April 26, 1882 (aged 60); London
- Occupation: Genealogist

Signature
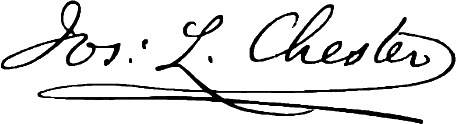

Joseph Lemuel Chester (1821–1882) was an American genealogist, poet and editor. He is known for his genealogical research on many prominent American families.

== Biography ==
Chester was born in Norwich, Connecticut on April 30, 1821. His father, Joseph Chester, was a grocer and his mother was Prudee Tracy. After Joseph died in 1832, Prudee married the Reverend John Hall, of the Ashtabula Episcopal Church in Ashtabula, Ohio.

At an early age, Chester became a teacher at a school in Ballston, New York. In 1837, he was appointed clerk of a land agency office in Warren, Ohio. In 1838, at age 17, he moved to New York City in order to study law. However, Chester instead took a job as a clerk at Tappan & Co., a silk importer.

Chester's literary tastes developed at an early age. While in New York, he contributed articles and poems to newspapers and magazines. The Knickerbocker magazine for January 1843 contains his poem Greenwood Cemetery,, credited to his favorite pseudonym, Julian Cramer. That same year, Chester published his first volume of poetry, Greenwood Cemetery and Other Poems, in New York and Boston.

During this period, Chester travelled the United States lecturing on temperance issues. Around 1845, Chester moved to Philadelphia, where he obtained a job as a merchant's clerk. In 1847, and for some years subsequently, Chester was a commissioner of deeds in Philadelphia. From 1845 to 1850, he also served as the musical editor of Godey's Lady's Book magazine In 1852, he became one of the editors of The Philadelphia Inquirer and of the Daily Sun. After the consolidation of the city of Philadelphia, Chester was elected a member of the city council in 1854.

During several sessions of Congress, Chester visited Washington D.C. as a corresponding editor and as an assistant clerk in the U.S. House of Representatives. In 1885, Governor James Pollock of Pennsylvania appointed Chester as one of his aide-de-camps. Chester was granted the rank of colonel. His position ended in 1858, but he was called colonel after that.

While in Washington D.C, Chester received a job to sell patent rights in England. He arrived in Liverpool on September 6, 1858. Various causes prevented Chester from succeeding in his undertaking, but he settled in London and made it his residence till his death.

For a time, he kept up his connection with the American newspaper press and for about three years furnished a weekly letter from London to The Philadelphia Inquirer. His first work in England was John Rogers, the Compiler of the First Authorized English Bible, the Pioneer of the English Reformation, and its First Martyr,. Creating this book took an enormous toll on Chester's health.

Joseph Lemuel Chester died in London, on May 26, 1882. He was buried in Nunhead Cemetery in London on May 31.

== Genealogical career ==
After the American Civil War broke out in 1861, Chester considered returning to America. However, the U.S. Federal Government gave him a commission to research the British genealogical records on American families. In 1862, Chester obtained free access to Doctors' Commons, a British legal society, as a literary inquirer to examine all the wills that had been recorded there prior to 1700, and to make copies of those that applied to American families. Chester continued this work in Great Britain for the next 20 years,

While working for the U.S. Government, Chester also performed special genealogical searches for his own clients and investigated the English descent of noted Americans. He printed some the resulting monographs himself, but most of them went without printing to his clients. Chester had wanted to publish a monograph on the family tree of President George Washington. However, Chester was never able to establish which English emigrant was the founder of the American branch of the Washington family, so the monograph was never completed.

In 1869, Chester was one of the founders of the Harleian Society. He became a member of the first council of the Royal Historical Society in 1870, and a member of many other learned societies both in England and in America. Chester spent half his time replying to the inquiries of his numerous correspondents.

In 1877, in recognition of Chester's genealogical research, Columbia University granted him the honorary degree of LL.D. On June 22, 1881, Oxford granted him the degree of D.C.L.

== Works ==
As part of his work, Chester made extensive extracts from British parish registers. At his death, Chester left eighty-seven folio volumes of such extracts, each more than four hundred pages with seventy of the volumes carefully indexed. Between 1866 and 1869, Chester copied information from the matriculation register of Oxford University. He next made extensive extracts from The Old Marriage Allegations in the Bishop of London's Register, extending from 1598 to 1710.

Chester's major work in London was the editing and annotating of The Marriage, Baptismal, and Burial Registers of the Collegiate Church or Abbey of St. Peter, Westminster, dedicated to Queen Victoria. He spent ten years on this book and allowed the Harleian Society to issue it as one of their publications.

Chester's literary executor, George Edward Cokayne, Norroy King of Arms, sold the manuscript of the Matriculations at the University of Oxford for £1,500, and five volumes of Marriage Allegations in the Bishop of London's Register, &c., for £500 to Leonard Lawrie Hartley. When Hartley died, these manuscripts were purchased in 1885 by Mr. Quaritch. The Matriculations were printed in eight volumes (1891) and the Marriages in one volume (1887) under the editorship of Joseph Foster. The Harleian Society also printed the Marriages from a duplicate copy of Chester's manuscript in 1887.

== Works ==
1. Greenwood Cemetery and other Poems 1843
2. A Treatise on the Law of Repulsion 1853
3. Educational Laws of Virginia, the Personal Narrative of Mrs. Margaret Douglas 1854
4. John Rogers, the compiler of the First Authorised English Bible 1861
5. The Marriage, Baptismal, and Burial Registers of the Abbey of St. Peter, Westminster 1876, which, besides being brought out in the Publications of the Harleian Society, was also Privately Printed for the Author.
6. The Reiester Booke of Saynte Denis Backchurch parishe 1878
7. The Parish Registers of St. Mary Aldermary, London 1880
8. The Visitation of London 1880, in which he assisted J. J. Howard, LL.D., in editing
9. The Parish Registers of St. Thomas the Apostle, London 1881
10. The Parish Registers of St. Michael, Cornhill, London 1882

He was also a contributor to the Register, the Heraldic Journal, the Herald and Genealogist, Transactions of Royal Historical Society, Proceedings of the Massachusetts Historical Society, the Athenæum, the Academy, Notes and Queries, and other publications.
