= Wagner's Block =

- U.S. National Register of Historic Places
- U.S. National Historic Landmark District – Contributing property
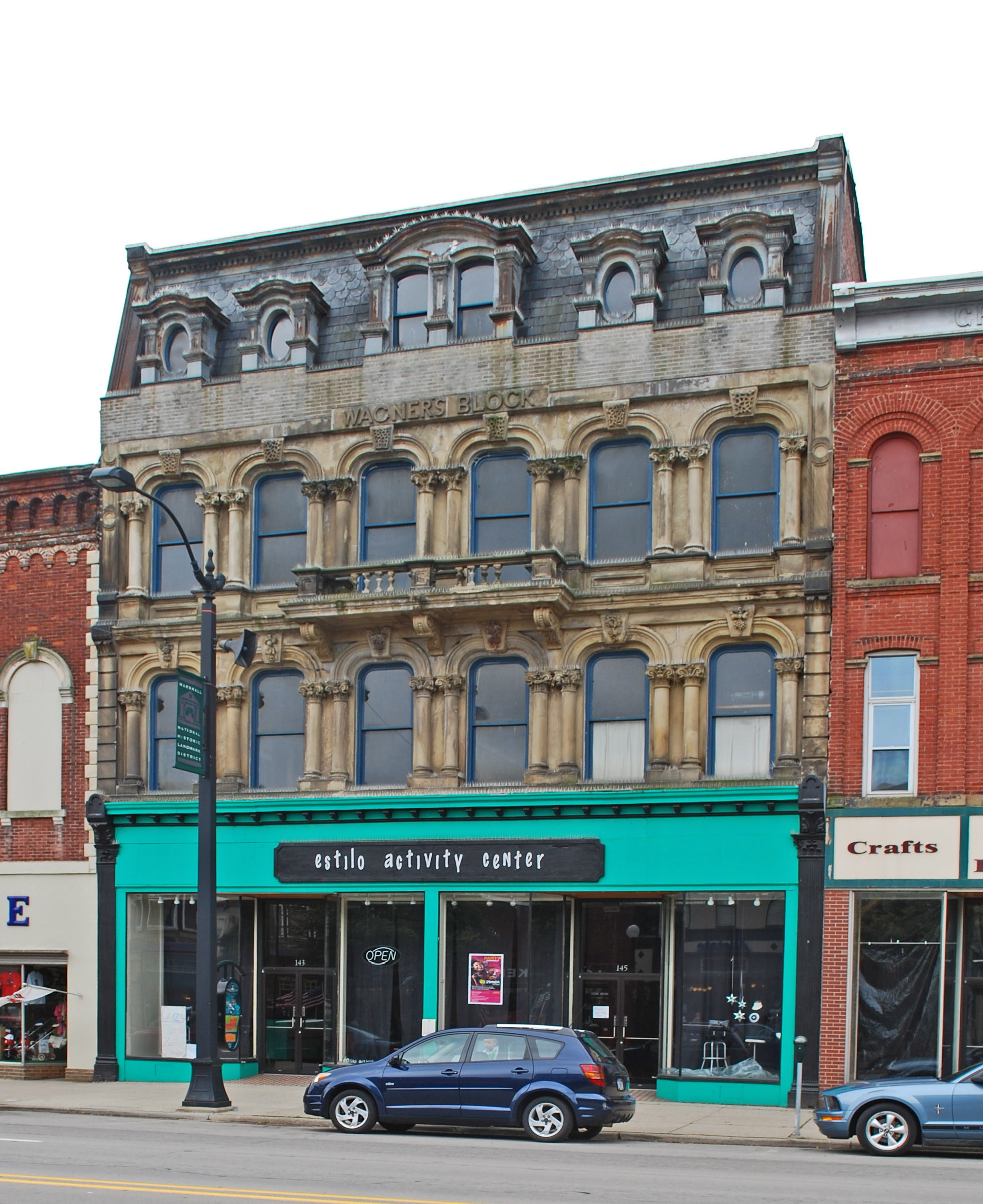
- Interactive map
- Location: 143 W. Michigan Ave., Marshall, Michigan
- Coordinates: 42°16′19″N 84°57′38″W
- Area: less than one acre
- Built: 1870
- Architect: John Mills Van Osdel
- Architectural style: Second Empire
- Part of: Marshall Michigan Historic Landmark District (ID91002053)
- NRHP reference No.: 71000385
- Added to NRHP: October 7, 1971

Wagner's Block is a historic commercial building located at 143 West Michigan Avenue in Marshall, Michigan. It was listed on the National Register of Historic Places in 1971.

== History ==
Martin V. Wagner arrived in Marshall in 1863 at the age of 18, reportedly penniless. He started clerking at a store, then turned to reading law with a local attorney. By 1870, he had amassed enough wealth that he could construct this commercial block in downtown Marshall. Wagner hired John Mills Van Osdel of Chicago to design this building. Construction was completed in 1871. Over time, the building housed various commercial enterprises on the ground floor, with Wagner's insurance agency on the second floor, and a ballroom/auditorium on the third. Wagner died in 1891.

== Description ==
Wagner's Block is a three-story Second Empire commercial building with a mansard roof. It has a heavily ornamented cast iron and limestone facade, with oval windows set into the slate covered mansard roof. Below, windows on the second and third stories are flanked by engaged Corinthian columns supporting heavy window hoods. A balcony projects from the third floor. The facade of the first floor has been modernized with large panes of glass.
