= Harold C. Brooks House =

- U.S. National Register of Historic Places
- U.S. National Historic Landmark District – Contributing property
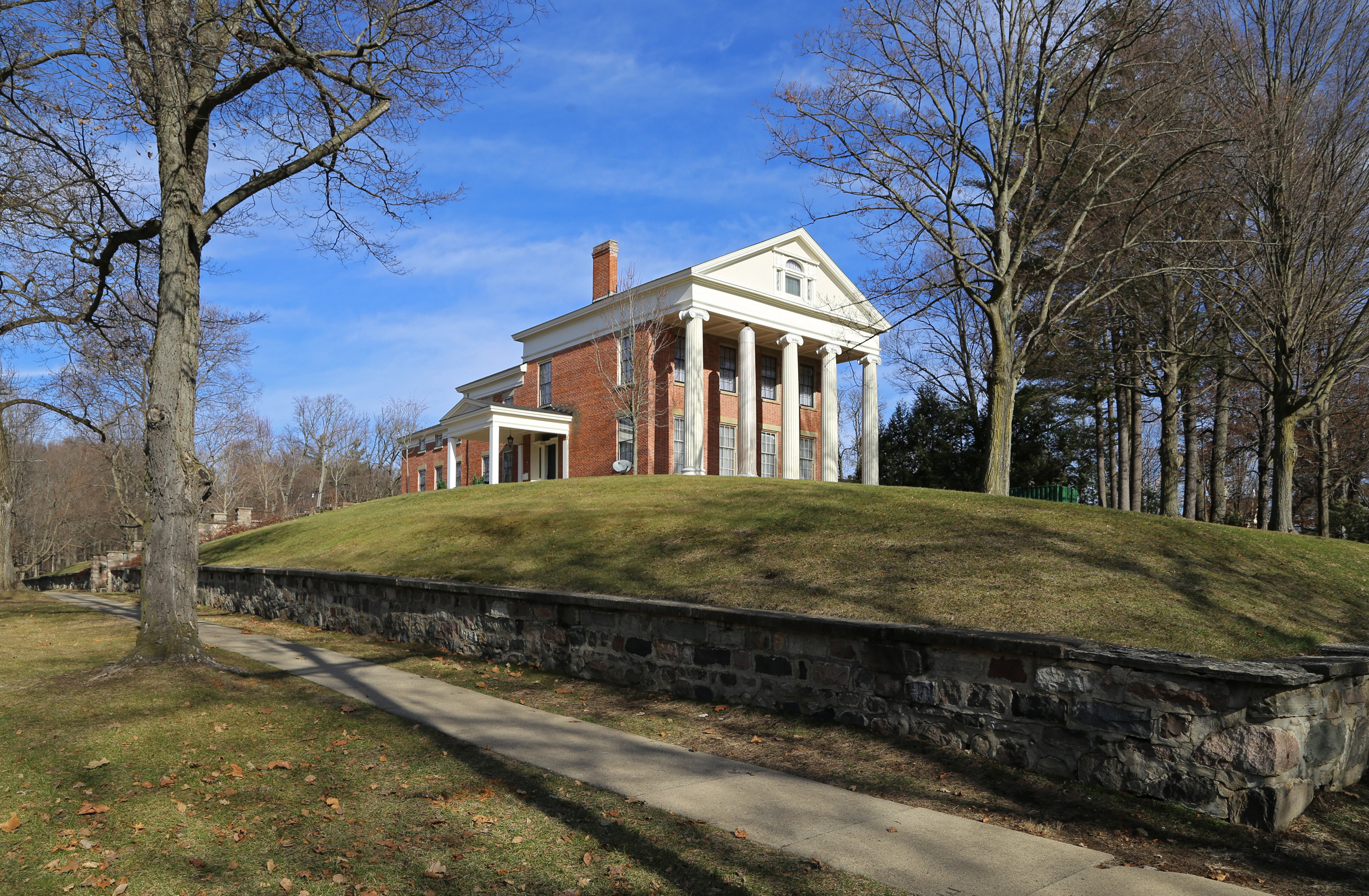
- Interactive map
- Location: 310 N. Kalamazoo Ave., Marshall, Michigan
- Coordinates: 42°16′28″N 84°57′50″W
- Area: 2.5 acres (1.0 ha)
- Built: 1840
- Built by: Jabez S. Fitch
- Architect: Richard Upjohn, Jens Jensen
- Architectural style: Greek Revival
- Part of: Marshall Michigan Historic Landmark District (ID91002053)
- NRHP reference No.: 84001422 (original); 06001330 (increase)

Significant dates
- Added to NRHP: July 8, 1970
- Boundary increase: April 18, 1984

The Harold C. Brooks House, also known as the Jabez S. Fitch House or the Charles T. Gorham House, is a historic home located at 310 N. Kalamazoo Avenue in Marshall, Michigan. It was listed on the National Register of Historic Places in 1970, with the surrounding grounds added in 1984.

== History ==
Jabez S. Fitch was a wealthy Marshall dry-goods dealer. In about 1840, he constructed this house, possibly using plans from New York architect Richard Upjohn. Fitch died in 1843, and the house was sold to Charles T. Gorham in 1851. Gorham was born in Connecticut in 1812, and came to Marshall in 1836. He opened a bank in 1840 and was active in the community. He was one of the founders of the Republican Party and served as a state senator and a delegate to the Republican national convention. He was appointed minister to the Hague by Ulysses S. Grant and served there from 1870 to 1875, then served as Assistant Secretary of the Interior from 1876-1877. Gorham owned the house until his death in 1901.

In 1921, prominent Midwest landscape architect Jens Jensen designed the surrounding grounds. In the mid-1930s, preservationist Harold C. Brooks purchased the house from the Gorham family to use as his own home and furnished it with antiques. The house has been frequently noted in architectural histories as one of the best-known examples of Greek Revival architecture in the Midwest.

The house has undergone significant renovations over the past decade by current owners Kevin Koenig and Todd Hokanson in an effort to preserve its history as one of the nation's most notable examples of Greek Revival architecture.

== Description ==
The Brooks House is a two and ½-story brick temple-style Greek Revival house sitting on a stone foundation. The cellar of this home was finished as a traditional German-style rathskeller. The windows, door sills, and lintels are made of stone. The main wing measures 51 feet long and 39 feet wide, with a service wing which is at the rear measuring 26 by 25 feet. The front portico is 10 feet deep and contains five Ionic columns. The windows in the front are ten feet high and extend to the floor. The tympanum above the door contains a fanlight with wrought iron grilles and an eagle with outstretched wings. The sidelights and transoms on the entrances are also covered with wrought iron grilles.
