= Thomas Dubois Sherwood =

Thomas Dubois Sherwood (October 23, 1823 – May 25, 1875) was an American lawyer and judge.

== Early life ==
Sherwood was born on October 23, 1823, in Fishkill, New York. He was a son of Samuel Sherwood (1788–1827) and Ruth (née Dubois) Sherwood (1789–1826). Among his siblings were Elizabeth Sherwood, Frederick Augustus Sherwood, Walter Cunningham Sherwood (who married Elizabeth Bloomer), John Diddell Sherwood, Mary Sherwood, Daniel Perry Sherwood, and Isaac Sherwood.

His paternal grandfather, Joseph Sherwood, served as corporal and lieutenant in the Connecticut Militia from 1777 to 1781 during the American Revolutionary War. He was at Brandywine, Germantown, Valley Forge and Monmouth. At the close of the war he held the rank of Brigadier General and was an original member of the Society of the Cincinnati.

He prepared for college at Fishkill and Amenia before entering Yale College, like his elder brother John, who graduated with the class of 1839. While at Yale, he was one of fifteen sophomores who were discontented with the existing fraternity order on campus and founded Delta Kappa Epsilon. He graduated from Yale in 1846 and immediately afterwards entered Yale Law School.

== Career ==
After leaving college, he studied law at New York City and New Haven. In 1851 he went into practice with his brother, John D. Sherwood, in New York City and continued practicing with abundant success until 1865, when serious and long-continued ill-health obliged his brother to retire.

He continued to practice by himself until 1873, when he was named by Mayor William Frederick Havemeyer as a Justice of the Tombs Police Court in New York City. He served as Justice from 1873 until his death in 1875.

== Personal life ==
On January 25, 1849, at Boston, Massachusetts, Sherwood was married to Mary Hitchcock (1828–1852), the youngest daughter of Judge Samuel Johnson Hitchcock, the President of Yale Law School who was also the Mayor of New Haven, Connecticut from 1839 to 1842. Before her death in Brooklyn on October 13, 1852, they were the parents of:

- George Spencer Sherwood (born 1850)

In May 1858, Sherwood was remarried in New York City to Frances Anna "Fanny" Fitch (1835–1868), a daughter of Jabez S. Fitch, Esq., a wealthy dry goods dealer from Marshall, Michigan. Before her death in New York on August 9, 1868, they were the parents of:

- Catherine Fitch "Mai" Sherwood (1860–1947), a sister of the Vedanta Centres of Boston.
- Frances Anne Fitch Sherwood (1868–1951), who married Philip Leverett Saltonstall, a son of Leverett Saltonstall and Rose Smith (née Lee) Saltonstall (a daughter of John Clarke Lee), in 1890. After his death in 1919, she married Dr. Joel Ernest Goldthwait in 1936.

Justice Sherwood died, aged 51, on May 25, 1875, at the Gramercy Park Hotel in New York City. He was buried at Brookside Cemetery in Gilbertsville, New York.

=== Descendants ===
Through his daughter Frances, he was a grandfather of Philip Leverett Saltonstall Jr. (1899–1964), who married actress Maxine Jennings; Nathaniel Saltonstall (1903–1967); Katherine Leverett Saltonstall, who married Philip B. Weld; Frances Sherwood Saltonstall, who married George von Lengerke Meyer Jr. (son of George von Lengerke Meyer) and Dr. Eugene Hillhouse Pool; and Rose Lee Saltonstall (1892–1946), who married, as his second wife, William Chapman Potter, President of the Guaranty Trust Company of New York.
