= Samuel Johnson Hitchcock =

American lawyer (1786–1845)

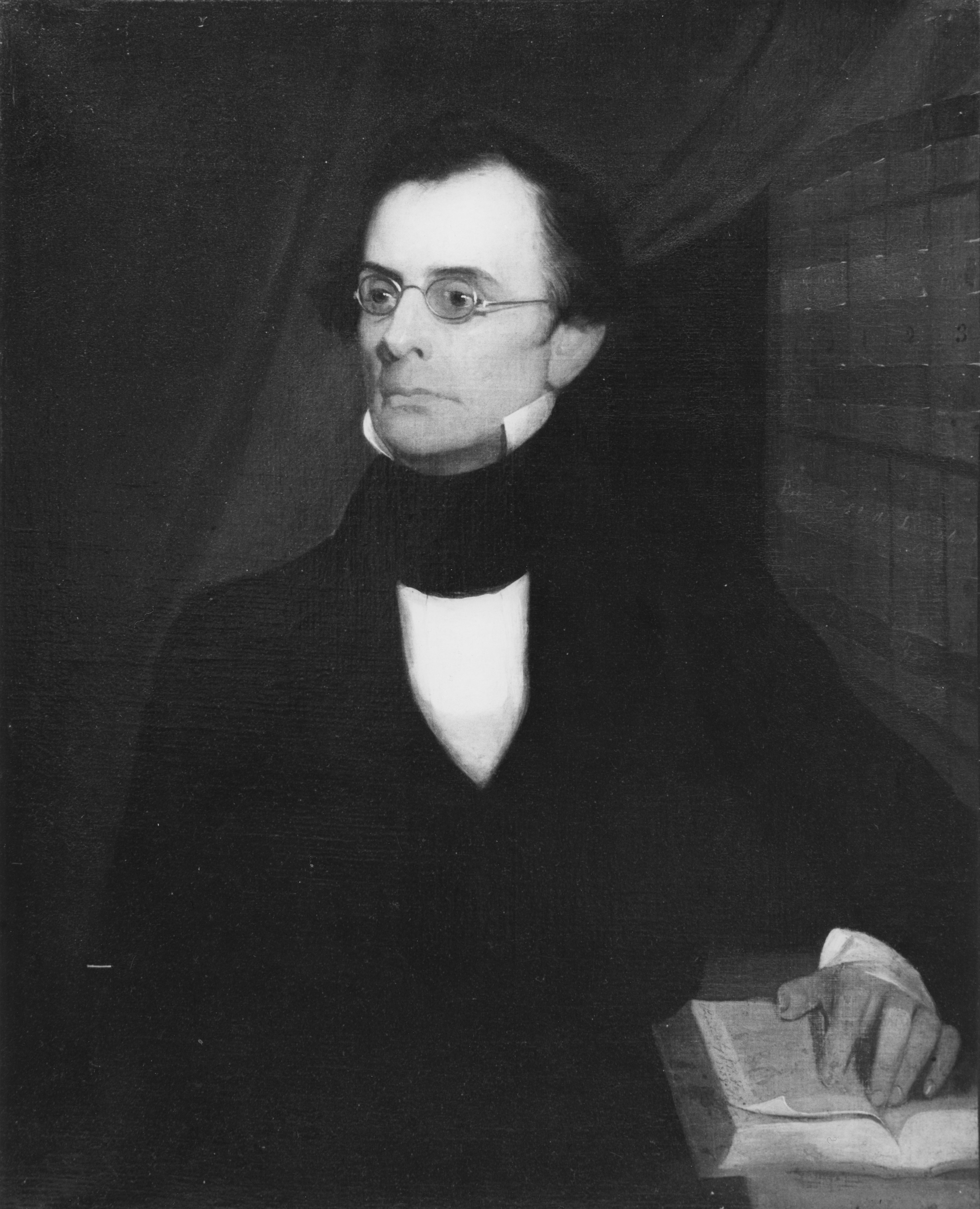
Portrait of Judge Samuel Johnson Hitchcock by Jared Bradley Flagg

Samuel Johnson Hitchcock (February 4, 1786 – August 31, 1845) was an American lawyer and judge who taught at New Haven Law School, which was absorbed by Yale University as their Yale Law School. He was also a railroad executive who served as president of the Hartford and New Haven Railroads.

== Early life ==
Hitchcock was born on February 4, 1786 in Woodbury, Connecticut. He was the eldest of twelve children born to and Mary (née Johnson) Hitchcock and Benjamin Hitchcock (1760–1816).

He was a descendant of Matthias Hitchcock, who came over from England and settled in New Haven, Connecticut in 1635. His paternal grandparents were Abigail Olds (née Ward) Hitchcock and Benjamin Hitchcock (a great-grandson of Matthias Hitchcock).

Since his family did not have funds for his education, he trained as a mechanic. His "great love of reading and education" and attracted the attention of the Rev. Azel Backus (who was later elected the first president of Hamilton College in 1812), who assisted in preparing him for college. He went on to attend Yale College and graduated as the valedictorian of his in 1809. After attending Litchfield Law School in 1809, he studied under fellow Yale alumnus and lawyer Seth Perkins Staples, taught for two years at Fairfield Academy, before working as a tutor at Yale for several years until he resigned in 1814 and consequently passed the bar in New Haven.

== Career ==
In 1815, he entered practice in New Haven. From 1820 to 1824, he was a partner in Staples & Hitchcock. After he became a teacher at New Haven Law School, Hitchcock divided his time between his legal practice and his teaching equally.

From 1838 to 1842, he was a Judge of the New Haven County Court. While Judge, he served as Mayor of New Haven from 1839 to 1841. From 1842 until 1844, he was Chief Judge of the New Haven County Court. He also served as a Judge of the Court of Common Pleas.

=== New Haven Law School ===
In 1820, Hitchcock became affiliated with his former instructor, Seth Perkins Staples, as a teacher at New Haven Law School, his private law school. After Staples moved to New York City in 1824, Hitchcock took control of the law school with Judge David Daggett who assisted him in his teaching. The school's affiliation with Yale began in the mid-1820s and in 1830, Hitchcock was made an instructor in law by Yale, even though his law school still remained separate. In 1842, he received an honorary degree of Doctor of Laws from Yale and, in 1843, the school's students began receiving Yale degrees. In 1846, a formal act of the Yale Corporation made the law department a branch of the college.

Hitchcock's law library became the beginning for Yale Law Library collection.

=== Business career ===
From its inception in 1833, he was a member of the first Board of Directors of the Hartford and New Haven Railroad. The first railroad built in the state of Connecticut and an important direct predecessor of the New York, New Haven and Hartford Railroad, he served as its President from 1837 to 1840. It built northwards from New Haven, opening its first segment in 1838, and reaching Hartford in December 1839. An agreement was signed with the New Haven and New York steamboat line to provide connecting steamboat service to New York City upon the railroad's opening.

He was also affiliated with the Farmington Canal Company. At the time of his death in 1845, he was working to establish a railroad between New Haven and Albany, New York.

== Personal life ==
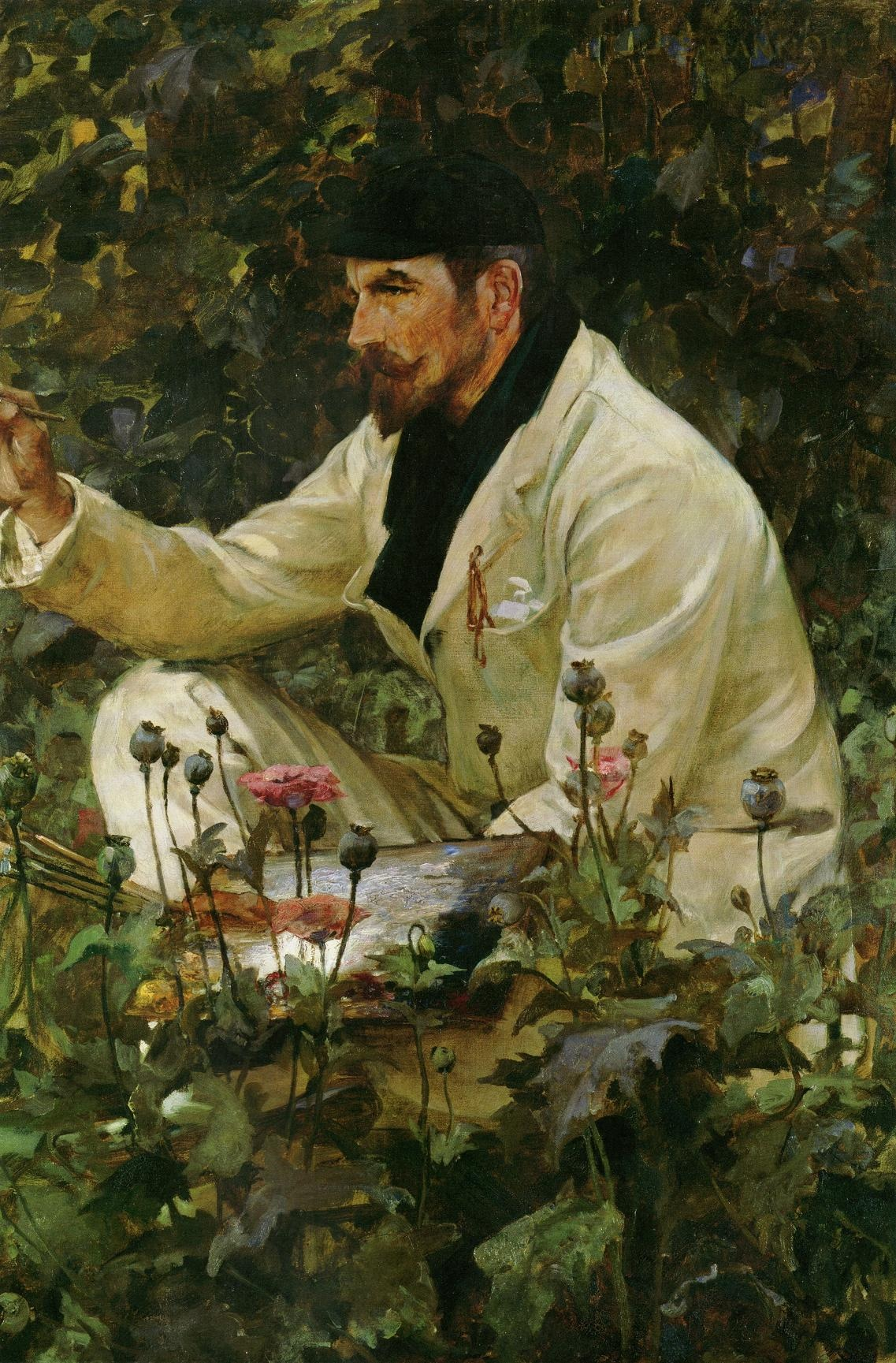
Portrait of his grandson, George Hitchcock, working in his Egmond garden by James Jebusa Shannon

On May 18, 1818, Hitchcock was married to Laura Coan (1798–1832), a daughter of Simeon Coan and Parnel (née Fowler) Coan, of Guilford. Before her death from consumption in 1832, they were the parents of five children, two sons and three daughters, including:

- Charles Coan Hitchcock (1823–1858), who married Olivia George Cowell, a daughter of Judge Benjamin Cowell of the Court of Common Pleas in Rhode Island, and the author of Spirit of '76, in 1847.
- Mary Hitchcock (1828–1852), who married lawyer and judge Thomas Dubois Sherwood in 1849.

After her death, Hitchcock married Narcissa (née Perry) Whittemore (1796–1854) on December 25, 1834 in Fredericksburg, Virginia. The daughter of merchant and ship owner Walter Perry and Elizabeth Burr (née Sturges) Perry, of Southport, she was the widow of Joseph Whittemore, of Fredericksburg, who died in Fairfield in July 1831. Narcissa's brother was Oliver Henry Perry, the Secretary of the State of Connecticut who served as Speaker of the Connecticut House of Representatives. She died, eleven years later, while on a trip to Southport. Together, they had one son:

- Samuel Whittemore Hitchcock, who graduated from Yale in 1856; he spent much of his life in France and Switzerland.

Hitchcock died in New Haven, Connecticut on August 31, 1845.

=== Descendants ===
Through his son Charles, he was a grandfather of George Hitchcock (1850–1913), an artist who married (and divorced) Henrietta Walker Richardson before marrying fellow artist Cecil Jay.
