= Brooks Field =

Brooks Field may refer to:

- Brooks Air Force Base, a former military facility in San Antonio, Texas, USA
- Brooks Field (Colorado), a football stadium in Golden, Colorado, USA
- Brooks Field (Michigan), an airport located in Marshall, Michigan, USA
- Brooks Field (Wilmington), a baseball venue on the campus of the University of North Carolina at Wilmington in Wilmington, North Carolina, USA
