= George Hitchcock (artist) =

American painter

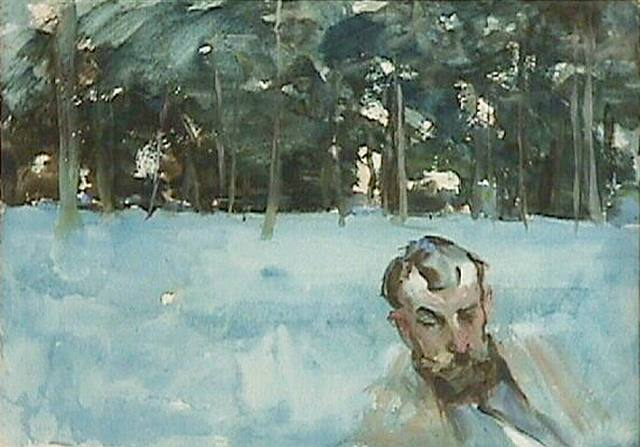
- Portrait by John Singer Sargent (1900)
- Born: September 29, 1850; Providence, Rhode Island
- Died: August 2, 1913 (aged 62); Marken, Netherlands
- Education: Brown University, Harvard Law School, Académie Julian
- Spouse(s): Henrietta Walker Richardson (m. 1881; div. 1905) Cecil Jay (m. 1905; died 1913)
- Patrons: Gustave Boulanger, Jules-Joseph Lefebvre

George Hitchcock (September 29, 1850 – August 2, 1913) was an American painter, born in Providence, Rhode Island, and was mostly active in Europe, notably in the Netherlands.

== Early life ==
Hitchcock was born in Providence, Rhode Island on September 29, 1850. He was a son of Charles Coan Hitchcock (1823–1858), and Olivia George Cowell.

His paternal grandparents were Samuel Johnson Hitchcock, a founder of Yale Law School, and, his first wife, Laura (née Coan) Hitchcock. His maternal grandfather was Judge Benjamin Cowell of the Court of Common Pleas in Rhode Island, and the author of Spirit of '76, in 1847. His aunt, Mary Hitchcock, was the first wife of lawyer and judge Thomas Dubois Sherwood.

Hitchcock graduated from Brown University, and from Harvard Law School in 1874. Hitchcock began his formal art education at the Heatherley's School of Fine Art in London in 1879. He then turned his attention to art and became a pupil of Gustave Boulanger and Jules-Joseph Lefebvre at the Académie Julian in Paris in 1882.

== Career ==
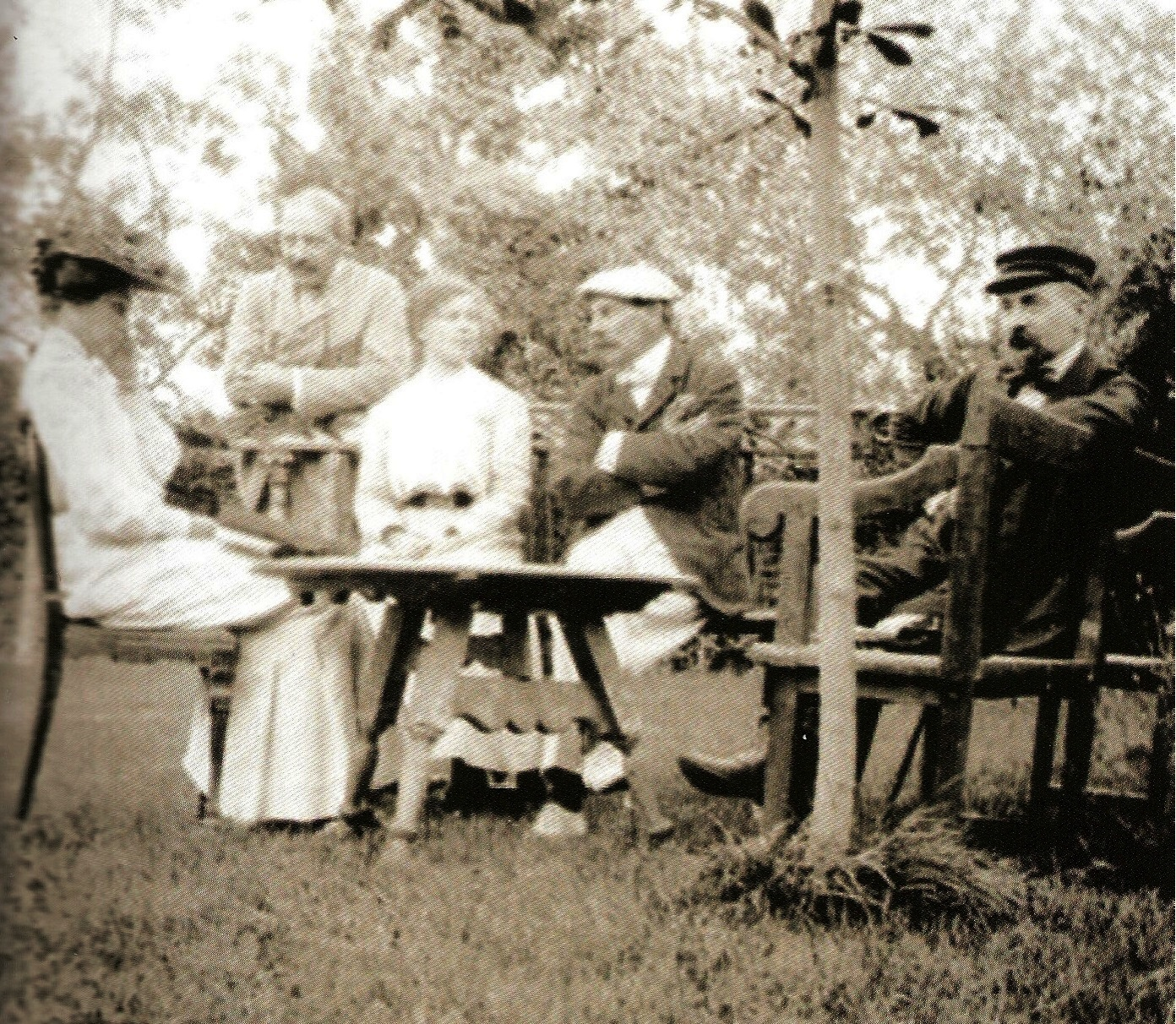
The Egmondse School (l.t.r.) Henriette Hitchcock, (unknown), Corinne Melchers, George Hitchcock and Gari Melchers. Archives, Gari Melchers Home and Studio.

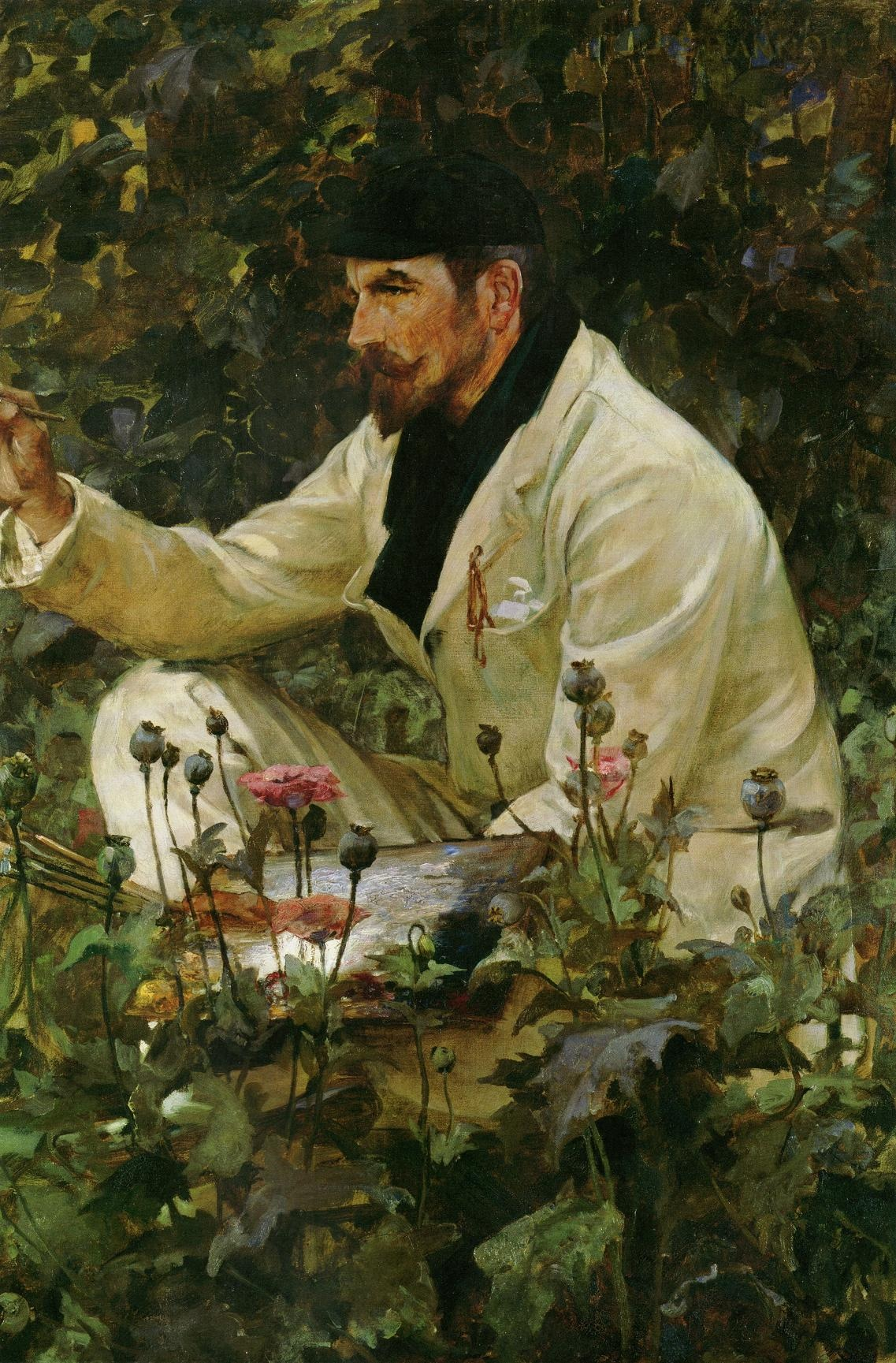
Hitchcock working in his Egmond garden by James Jebusa Shannon

He attracted notice in the Paris Salon of 1885 with his Tulip Growing, of a Dutch garden he painted in the Netherlands. For years he had a studio in that country near Egmond aan Zee, where he started his "Art Summer School" that later resulted in a group of returning summer artists, including Gari Melchers, that informally became the Egmondse School (1890-1905). He received these students and guests at his "Huis Schuylenburgh", a large estate in Egmond aan den Hoef.

He became a chevalier of the French Legion of Honour and a member of the Vienna Academy of Arts, the Munich Secession Society, and other art bodies, and is represented in the Dresden gallery, the imperial collection in Vienna, the Chicago Art Institute, and the Detroit Institute of Arts. In 1909, he was elected to the National Academy of Design as an Associate Academician.

== Personal life ==
Hitchcock married Henrietta Walker Richardson on July 6, 1881. He divorced her on July 31, 1905, and nine days later married Cecil Jay, a student at the Art Summer School who was thirty-three years his junior. The newlyweds moved to Paris, effectively ending the summer school.

At the time of his death in 1913, he was living in a houseboat in the harbor of Marken, Netherlands.

== Selected paintings ==
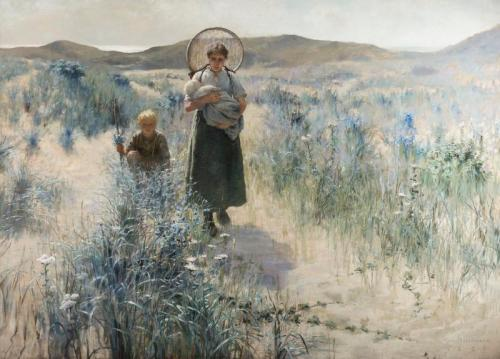
Maternité (1889), Aberdeen Archives, Gallery & Museums Collection

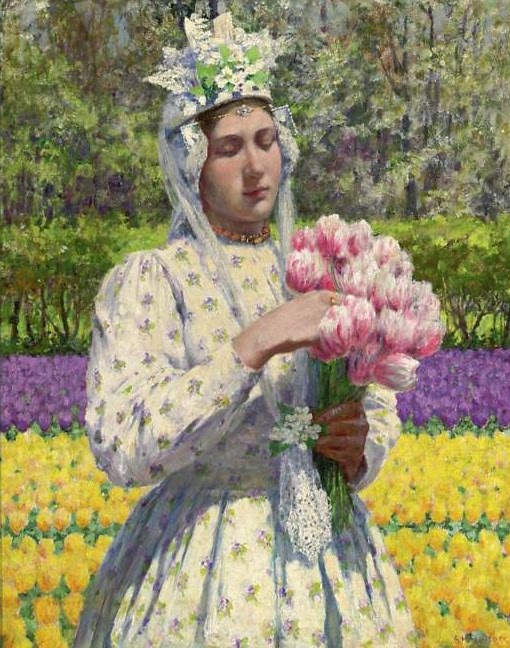
Dutch bride, c.1890

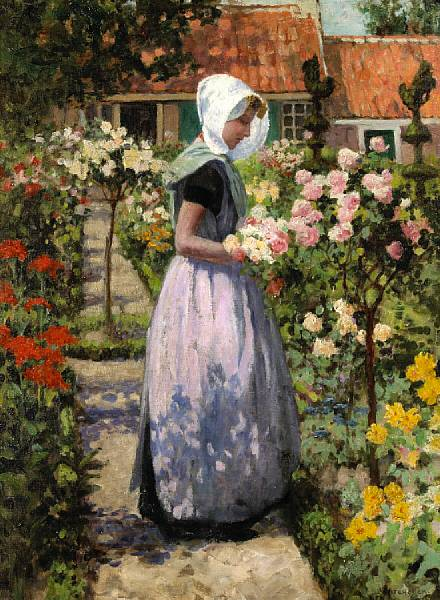
Dutch woman in a garden, c.1890

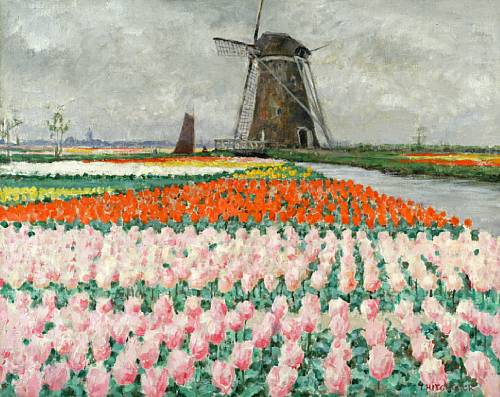
Bulb fields with windmill, c.1890

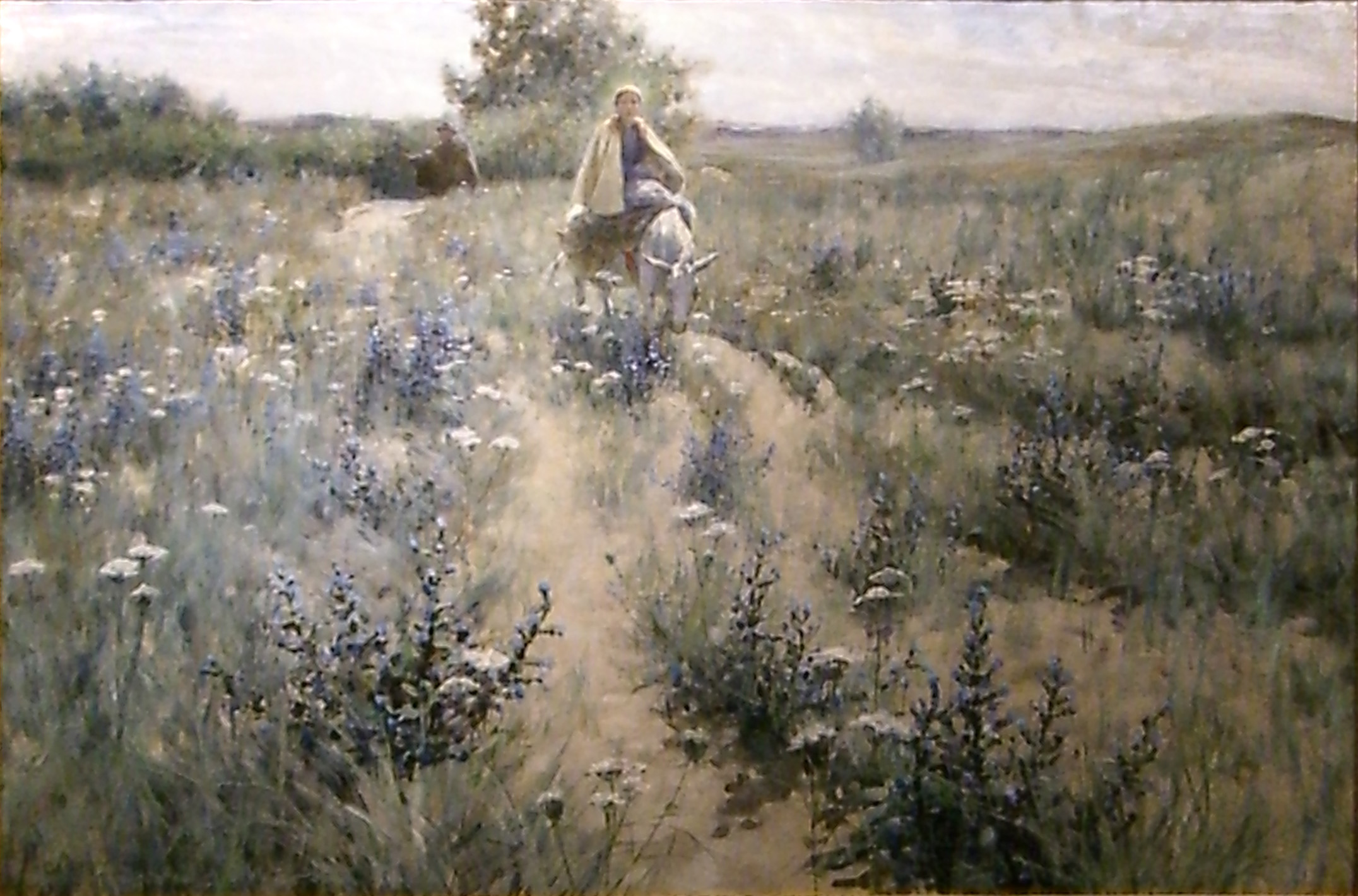
The Flight into Egypt, 1892, the Smithsonian Museum, Washington, D.C., 1892

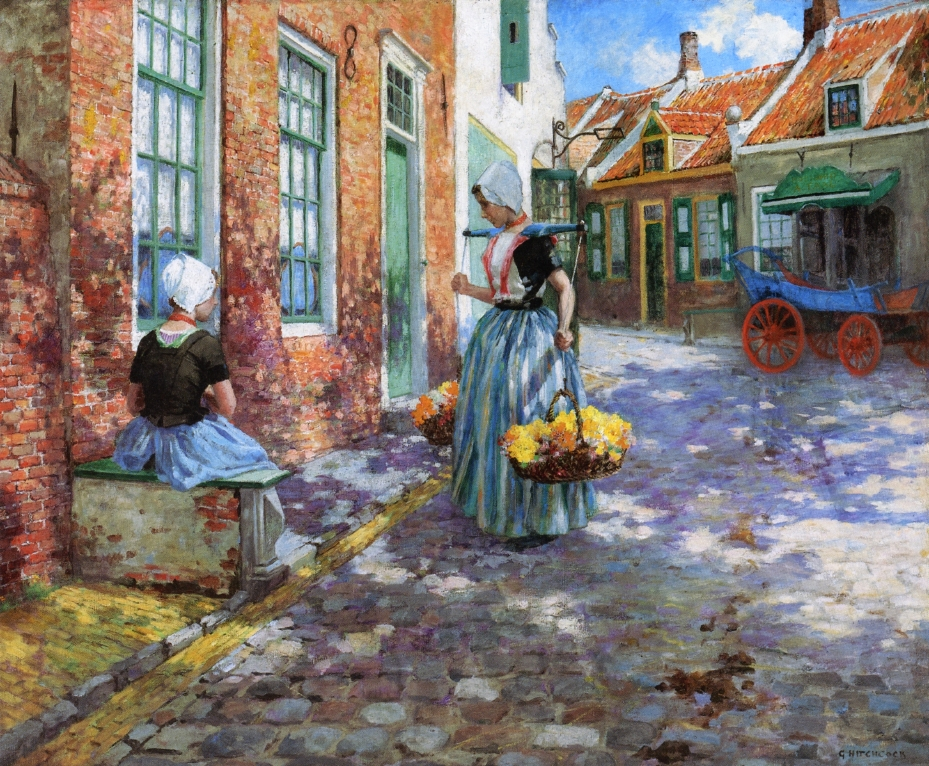
Dutch Flower Girls

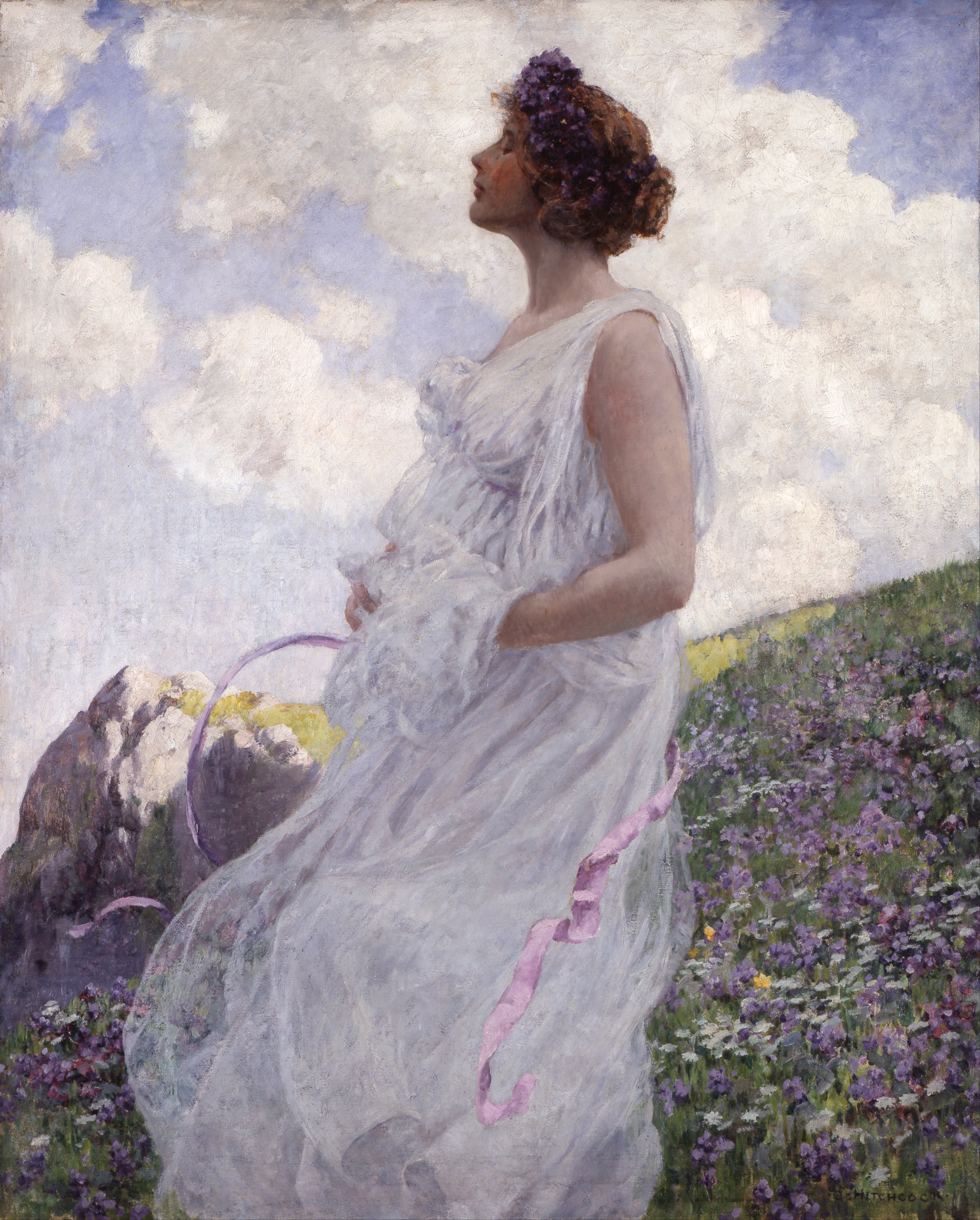
Calypso c.1906
