= Senator Pratt =

Senator Pratt may refer to:

== Members of the United States Senate ==
- Daniel D. Pratt (1813–1877), U.S. Senator from Indiana from 1869 to 1875
- Thomas Pratt (Maryland politician) (1804–1869), U.S. Senator from Maryland from 1850 to 1857

== U.S. state senate members ==
- Abner Pratt (1801–1863), Michigan State Senate
- Eric Pratt (born 1964), Minnesota State Senate
- Frank Pratt (politician) (born 1942), Arizona State Senate
- George W. Pratt (1830–1862), New York State Senate
- George White Pratt (1840–1899), Wisconsin State Senate
- James T. Pratt (1802–1887), Connecticut State Senate
- Samuel Pratt (1817–1878), Wisconsin State Senate
