= Honolulu House =

Historic house in Michigan, United States

- U.S. National Register of Historic Places
- U.S. National Historic Landmark District – Contributing property
- Michigan State Historic Site
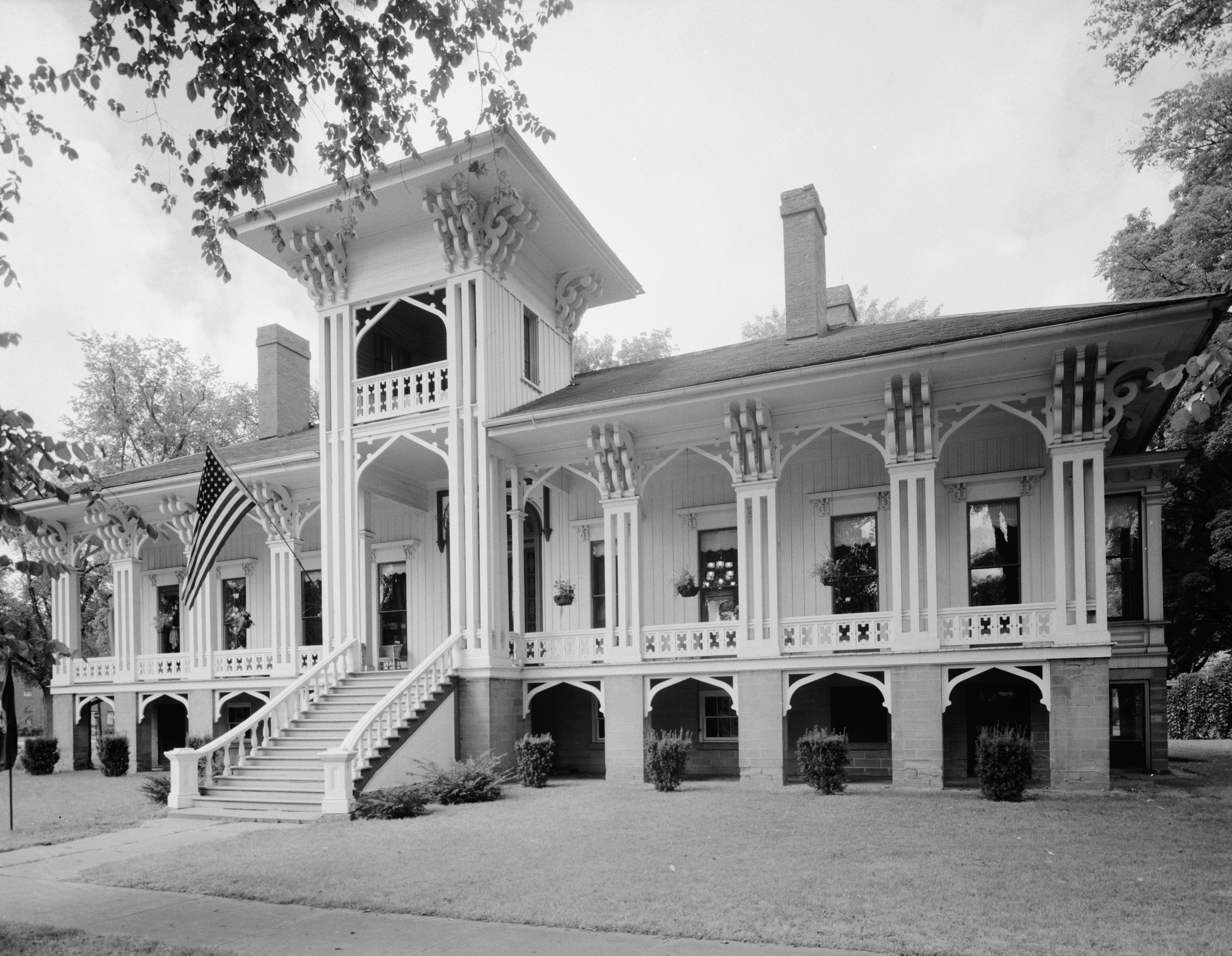
- Abner Pratt House (Honolulu House) in 1965

- Location within Michigan Location within the United States
- Interactive map
- Location: 107 N. Kalamazoo Avenue, Marshall, Michigan
- Coordinates: 42°16′21.7″N 84°57′52.4″W
- Built: 1860
- Architectural style: Italianate
- Part of: Marshall Michigan Historic Landmark District (ID91002053)
- NRHP reference No.: 70000267

Significant dates
- Added to NRHP: July 8, 1970
- Designated NHLDCP: July 17, 1991

Honolulu House, also known as the Abner Pratt House, is a historic home in Marshall, Michigan, built in 1860 as a Hawaiian-inspired house with Italianate and Gothic Revival styles.

== History ==
The house was built by Abner Pratt, a former chief justice of the Michigan Supreme Court and United States Consul to Hawaii under President James Buchanan. Pratt lived in the Hawaiian islands for many years, and after settling in Marshall, he began to recreate his former surroundings by building Honolulu House. The house was built across the street from a house that Pratt had built as a wedding gift for his daughter in 1841. The Honolulu house has a sprawling wraparound porch, reminiscent of the Hawaiian 'Iolani Palace. The walls were painted with tropical scenes.

Pratt died of pneumonia in 1863. The house was renovated in 1951 and was acquired in 1961 by the Marshall Historical Society for use as a museum.

== Description ==
The Honolulu House is a two-story House clad in white vertical board and batten siding and sitting on a five-foot high sandstone foundation. The house measures 77 feet long by 37 feet deep. The front of the house has a deep, wide veranda supported by ornamental columns on sandstone piers. Massive triple brackets are atop each column, and ornamental wood tracery arches connect each pair of columns. The window locations are symmetrical, with large bay windows on each end of the house. Main floor windows are topped with wooden ornamental hoods. Above is a hipped roof, with four symmetrically placed chimneys, and a distinctive pagoda-roofed tower sitting above the main doorway and entrance stairs.

== See also ==
- Oaklands Historic House Museum
