= Abner Pratt =

American judge

Abner Pratt (May 22, 1801 – March 27, 1863) was an American lawyer, politician, diplomat, and jurist.

Born in Springfield, Otsego County, New York, Pratt studied law and was admitted to the New York bar. Pratt served as district attorney in Rochester, New York. In 1839, Pratt moved to Marshall, Michigan and continued to practice law. In 1844 and 1845, Pratt served in the Michigan State Senate. From 1850 until 1857, Pratt served on the Michigan Supreme Court and served as chief justice of the court. In 1857, President James Buchanan appointed Pratt consul to the Kingdom of Hawaii serving until 1862. Pratt returned to Marshall, Michigan and built his home Honolulu House. In 1863, Pratt served in the Michigan House of Representatives and served as mayor of Marshall, Michigan. Pratt died in Marshall, Michigan in 1863.
