= Calhoun County Fair =

Community event in Marshall, Michigan, US

Coordinates: 42.26578°N 84.95111°W

The Calhoun County Fair
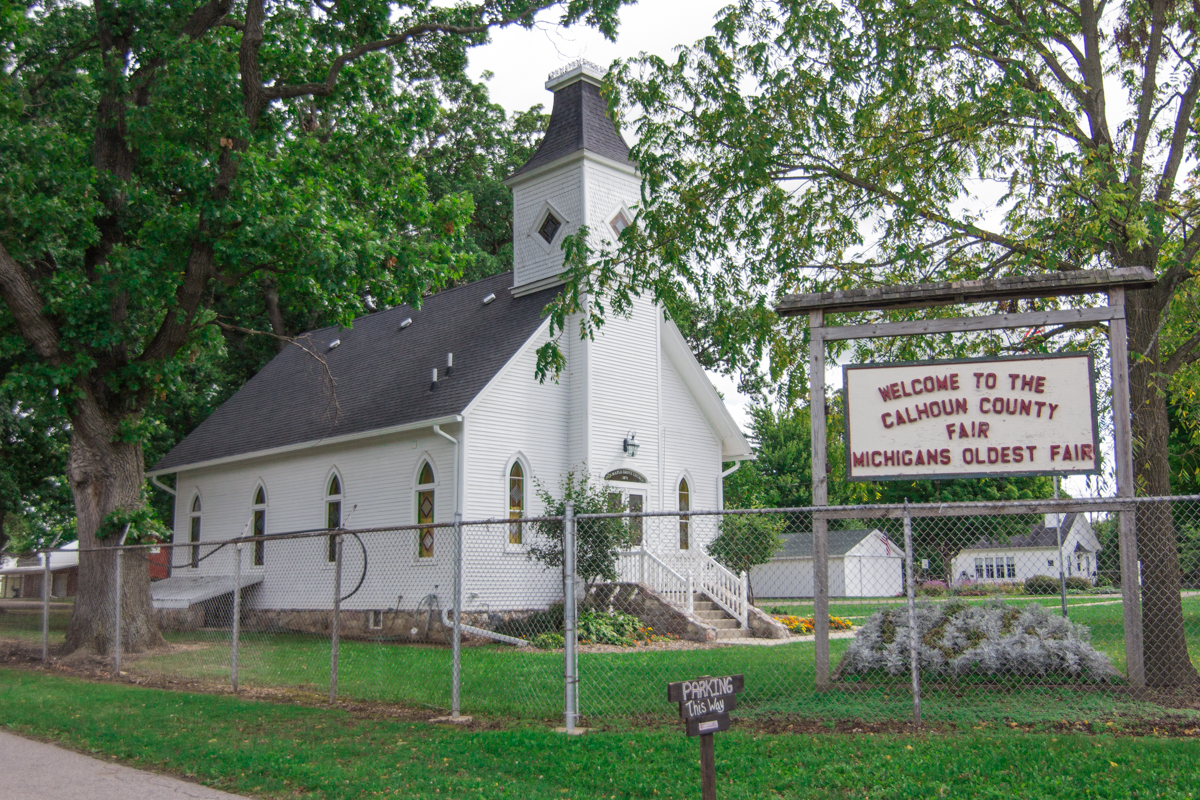
- The entrance sign to the fair
- Genre: Fair
- Dates: August
- Location: Marshall, Michigan
- Years active: 1839; 187 years ago
- Inaugurated: 1839
- Website: Official website

The Calhoun County Fair in Marshall, Michigan, is Michigan's oldest continuous running fair.

== History ==
The fairgrounds were founded in 1848. Ever since then, they have featured 45 acres (180,000 m^{2}) of a mixture of sunny and shady grounds, paved streets, and fresh green grass. Many of the original oak trees are still present on its magnificent landscape.

The Calhoun County Fair was first held in 1839. It was held in various places between its starting year and 1947, but made its permanent home on the fairgrounds in 1948. It has been an iconic site of Marshall ever since.

The fair was cancelled in 2020, the first time since 1848, due to the COVID-19 pandemic. The 2021 fair is scheduled for August 15–21.

== Attractions ==
There are a variety of things to do and see at the Calhoun County Fair.

- Carnival Rides - There are rides to go on for both children and adults.
- Carnival Games - A variety of carnival games where players can win prizes are available to play at that fair.
- Animal Barns - There are barns where fair attendants can go in and view a variety of farm animals.
- Animal Auctions - Large and small farm animals are auctioned off to bid-placing fair attendants.
- Arts and Crafts Barns - A variety of arts and crafts are available for the attendants to view throughout the fair.
- Merchant Stands - A variety of things can be bought by merchants at the fair.
- Food Stalls - There are many stalls to buy traditional fair foods found throughout the fair.
- Firework Shows - At night, usually on the final day of the fair, a display of fireworks will be shown to the attendants.
