= National House (Marshall, Michigan) =

- U.S. National Register of Historic Places
- U.S. National Historic Landmark District – Contributing property
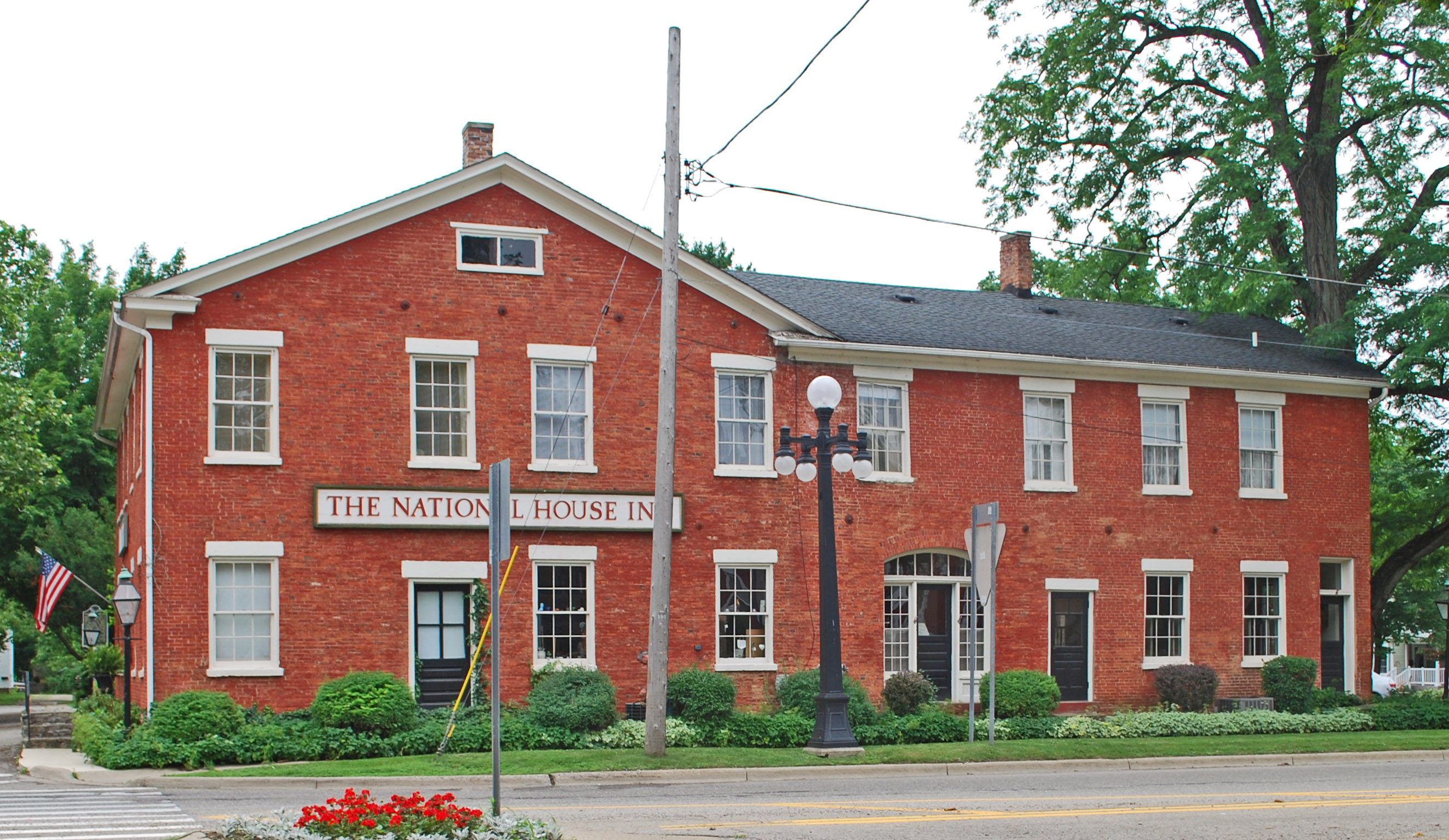
- Interactive map
- Location: 102 S. Parkview, Marshall, Michigan
- Coordinates: 42°16′19″N 84°57′54″W
- Area: less than one acre
- Built: 1834
- Built by: George Bentley, Nathan Benedict
- Part of: Marshall Michigan Historic Landmark District (ID91002053)
- NRHP reference No.: 78001493
- Added to NRHP: January 3, 1978

The National House is a hotel located at 102 South Parkview in Marshall, Michigan. It was listed on the National Register of Historic Places in 1978. It is thought to be the first brick building constructed in Calhoun County. As of 2019, the building operated as a bed and breakfast.

== History ==
In 1834, local businessman Andrew Mann hired George Bentley and Nathan Benedict to construct a brick hotel. The structure was completed in 1835, and Mann opened the inn by hosting a formal ball on January 1, 1836. Mann leased the inn to another proprietor in 1837, but it continued to prosper as a stop on the Territorial Road to Detroit. By 1837 it was one of three taverns in Marshall, and by 1877 it was one of eight hotels in the area. Around this time an addition was constructed. In 1879, it was sold by Mrs. R. A. Facey, and ceased operating as a hotel. For a time it housed a factory for wagons and windmills, and around 1900 it was purchased by Dr. Andrew Dean, who converted it into an apartment building. It operated as apartments until it was purchased by the Minick and Kinney families in 1976. The new owners refurbished the building, and in 1977 reopened it as the National House Inn. As of 2019, the National House is open as a bed and breakfast.

== Description ==
The National House is a two-story brick hotel on a sandstone foundation with a gable roof. It is built in an L plan, with the main facade fronting onto Parkview and the old Courthouse Square. This facade has a central door opening containing a transom and side panels around the door. Flanking the entrance are two irregularly placed windows. Five window bays run across the second floor. All windows have plain stone lintels and slipsills. On the side, the gable facade of the main rectangle has three windows and a linteled door on the ground floor and four second story windows, with one smaller window located above under the eaves. A gabled four bay extension, which defines the shorter leg of the L, continues the facade. This extension contains openings similar to the main facade. The late 1870s brick addition is a two-story, six-bay structure adjoining the original section in one corner.
