= Charles T. Gorham =

American banker and diplomat

Charles Truesdell Gorham
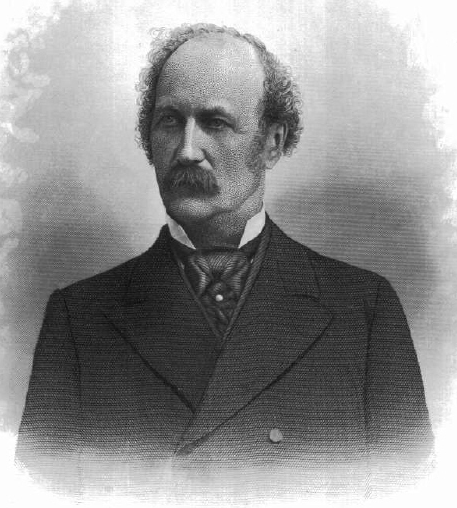

U.S. Minister to the Netherlands
- In office December 15, 1870 – July 9, 1875
- President: Ulysses S. Grant
- Preceded by: Joseph Pomeroy Root
- Succeeded by: Francis B. Stockbridge

Member of the Michigan Senate from the 13th district
- In office 1859–1860
- Preceded by: Nathan Pierce
- Succeeded by: George H. French

Personal details
- Born: May 29, 1812 Danbury, Connecticut, US
- Died: March 11, 1901 (aged 88) Marshall, Michigan, US
- Party: Republican
- Spouse: Charlotte Eaton Hart
- Children: 3

Charles Truesdell Gorham (May 29, 1812 – March 11, 1901) was a Michigan banker and diplomat. He was a founder of the Republican party, an anti-slavery activist and a major general and division commander in the Michigan Militia during the years immediately before the American Civil War. After the war he served as United States Ambassador to the Netherlands and Assistant Secretary of the Interior.

== Life and career ==
Gorham was born in Danbury, Connecticut on May 29, 1812. He was raised in Oneonta, New York and trained for a business career.

In 1836, Gorham moved to Marshall, Michigan where he was a merchant. In 1840, he started a bank, which he operated privately until 1865. That year he incorporated the institution as the First National Bank of Marshall, and he served as president until retiring in 1898.

Originally a Democrat and later a Whig, Gorham was one of the founders of the Republican party when it was organized in the mid-1850s. In 1855, he was appointed Major General and commander of one of three divisions in the state militia, and in 1859 he was elected to one term in the Michigan State Senate where he represented the 13th district. Gorham used both positions to recruit, train, and reorganize the militia in anticipation of the Civil War. He was a Delegate to the Republican National Conventions of 1864 and 1868, and served as a Presidential elector from Michigan in 1868, casting votes for the ticket of Ulysses S. Grant and Schuyler Colfax.

An anti-slavery activist and participant in the Underground Railroad, Gorham was one of the principals in the Crosswhite Affair, in which several people from Kentucky attempted to capture an African American family in Marshall and return them to slavery in Kentucky. More than 200 people from Marshall, led by Gorham, prevented this. The affair was the subject of several criminal and civil court cases, including the Giltner v. Gorham et al. federal case of June, 1848. It was one of the events that led to passage of the Fugitive Slave Act of 1850.

From 1870 to 1875 Gorham served as Minister to the Netherlands. He served as Assistant Secretary of the Interior from March, 1876 to April, 1877, afterwards returning to his banking interests in Marshall.

== Family ==
Gorham married Charlotte Eaton Hart of Durham, New York on April 10, 1839. They had two sons and one daughter—Selden H., Charles E. and Isabella.

== Retirement and death ==
Gorham retired in 1898. He died in Marshall on March 11, 1901, and was buried in Marshall's Oakridge Cemetery.

Diplomatic posts
Preceded by Joseph P. Root	U.S. Minister to the Netherlands; 1870–1875	Succeeded by Francis B. Stockbridge
