= Seth Perkins Staples =

American lawyer and politician

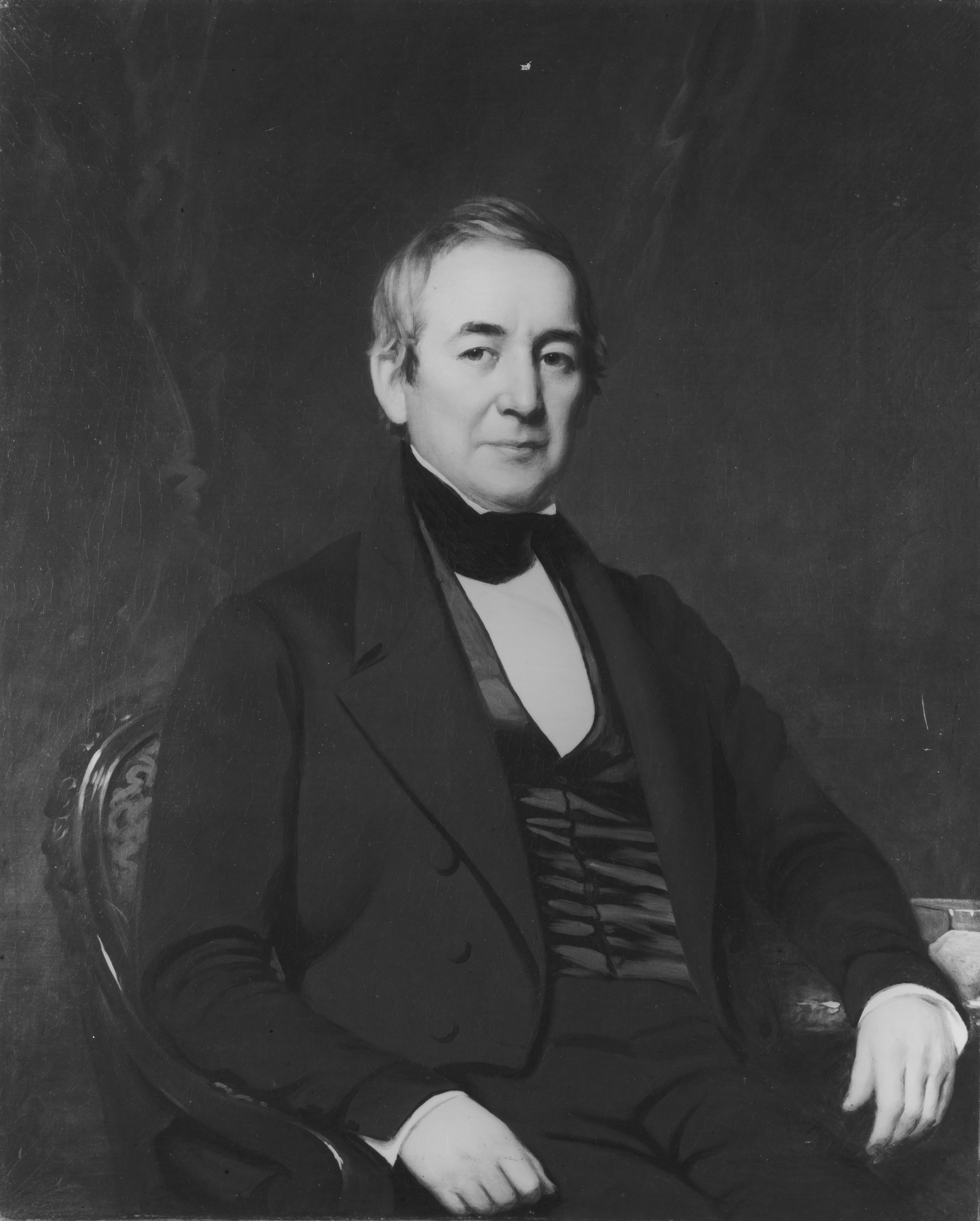
Seth Perkins Staples, portrait by Jared Bradley Flagg

Seth Perkins Staples (August 31, 1776 - November 6, 1861) was an American lawyer and politician. He founded what became the New Haven Law School, which was absorbed by Yale University as their Yale Law School. He was the brother-in-law of Roger Sherman Jr.

== Early life ==
Staples was born in Canterbury, Connecticut on August 31, 1776. He was the son of Rev. John Staples and Susanna (née Perkins) Staples.

He graduated from Yale College in 1797. After studying law for two years in the office of Judge Daggett, in New Haven, Connecticut, he was admitted to the bar in Litchfield, Connecticut, in September 1799.

== Career ==
After passing the bar, he began to practice law in New Haven. His legal attainments and his excellent library early drew around him a large number of students, and he soon found himself at the head of a flourishing private Law School. After toiling alone for several years, in 1820 he called to his aid Judge Samuel Johnson Hitchcock, and made him a partner both in his business and in his Law School. During this time he is known to have helped out future U.S. Attorney Asa Child. In 1846, the School thus originated, having meanwhile passed into other hands, was formally recognized by the Corporation of Yale College, as the Law Department of that Institution.

During his residence in New Haven, he was several times a Representative of the town, in the Legislature of Connecticut, but he withdrew wholly from public life in 1816.

In 1824 he moved from New Haven to New York City, where he was wholly devoted to his profession till about 1856. His ability, industry and attainments made him a distinguished ornament of the bar.

== Personal life ==
In November 1799, Staples was married to Catharine Wales, the only daughter of Rev S. Wales, a Professor of Divinity at Yale College. Together, they had three sons and three daughters.

He died in New York City on November 6, 1861, aged 85.
