= Samuel W Hill =

American surveyor, geologist and mining developer

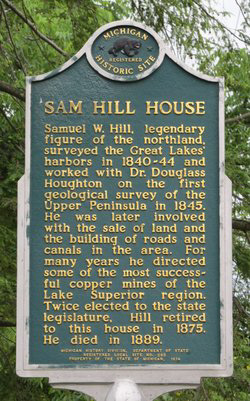
- Sam Hill House Historical Marker, Marshall, Michigan
- Born: November 6, 1815; Starksboro, Vermont
- Died: August 29, 1889 (aged 73); Marshall, Michigan
- Occupation: surveyor

Samuel W Hill (November 6, 1815 – August 28, 1889) was an American surveyor, geologist and mining developer in Michigan's Copper Country.

== Early life and experience ==
Samuel Worth Hill was born on November 9 , 1815 in Starksboro, Vermont to Richard and Betsey Hill. He was educated in a Friends school, and was trained as a civil engineer and a surveyor. His first assignment was to survey the town of Albion, New York. In 1840, he moved to Milwaukee, and became a school teacher in Racine. In 1841, Hill secured a position with the United States Topographical Survey, and undertook an expedition to mark the boundary line between Wisconsin and Michigan. He was then assigned to survey the western Upper Peninsula, including the Keweenaw Peninsula. In the fall of 1841, Hill returned to Racine and became a school superintendent until his appointment to survey the Upper Peninsula.

== Copper Country ==
Samuel W. Hill worked with Douglass Houghton in his lineal and geological survey of the Upper Peninsula. After Houghton died in 1845, Hill worked with Foster & Whitney to conduct a geological study the copper region. He discovered the value of the area's copper resources and organized the first mining companies, and later served as agent for the Quincy Mining Company. In 1859, Hill platted the village of Hancock, then in Portage Township. Hill also conceived of the idea of constructing a three-mile-long canal between Portage Lake and Lake Superior to transport freight to and from the copper mines. Hill assisted in organizing the Central and Phoenix mines and was the first president of Copper Falls. Later, Hill tried to develop the copper resources of Isle Royale around Siskiwit Bay.

== What in Sam Hill? ==
Samuel W Hill's propensity for profanity was legendary. Whenever his friends and neighbors would retell his colorful tales, they would substitute "Sam Hill" for the cuss words. Eventually, the phrase "What in Sam Hill?" spread beyond the Keweenaw Peninsula to become part of the American language.

== Legacy ==
Samuel W. Hill married Susan A. Warren, July 16, 1851. Miss Warren was a pioneer school teacher in the Upper Peninsula, and established the first school in the Keweenaw region. The Hills were to make their home in Marshall, Michigan. Hill later served in the Michigan legislature, being twice elected.

== Bibliography ==
- American biographical history of eminent and self-made men ... Michigan volume. Western Biographical Pub. Co. 1878.
- Ashlee, Laura Rose (2005). Traveling Through Time: A Guide to Michigan's Historical Markers. University of Michigan Press.
- Courter, Ellis W. (2005). Michigan's Copper Country: Contribution to Michigan Geology 92 01 (Report). Michigan Dept. of Environmental Quality.
- Hannan, Caryn; Herman, Jennifer L.; et al. (2008). Michigan Encyclopedia. State History Publications.
- Hill, Samuel W. (1854). Report. Copper Falls Mining Company.
- History of Calhoun County, Michigan ... With Illustrations Descriptive of Its Scenery, Palatial Residences, Public Buildings. L.H. Everts and Company. 1877.
- History of the Upper Peninsula of Michigan. University of Michigan Library. 2005.
- Martin, John Barlow (1986). Call It North Country, The Story of Upper Michigan. Wayne State University Press.
- "Michigan History Magazine, Volume 88". Bureau of History, Michigan Department of State. 2004.

== Related Links ==
- Elliott, Paul J. "If these stones could talk." Blog, 5 October 2012.
- History of the Upper Peninsula of Michigan, Houghton County
- Samuel W. Hill at Find a Grave
