= John D. Sherwood =

American lawyer

John D. Sherwood (November 24, 1818 – April 30, 1891) was an American author.

== Early life ==
Sherwood was born in Fishkill, New York, on November 24, 1818. He was a son of Ruth (née DuBois) Sherwood and Thomas Sherwood.

== Career ==
Immediately after graduating from Yale College in 1839, he began the study of law in Poughkeepsie, New York, in the office of Judge Ruggles. He also studied for a short time in the Harvard Law School before going abroad in August, 1841, for upwards of two years of foreign travel. In 1844 he completed his legal studies in New York City, in the office of the Hon. Samuel Sherwood, and in 1845 he was admitted to the bar. For six years he was in partnership with George Y. Gilbert, in New York City; and in 1851 he associated with himself his brother, Thomas Dubois Sherwood, and continued in that relation with abundant success until 1865, when serious and long-continued ill-health obliged him to retire.

In December, 1861, he received a Colonel's commission as aide on the staff of Gen. James S. Wadsworth, and in that capacity served in the Army of the Potomac. His later years were spent in Englewood, N. J., and were principally devoted to literary pursuits. His best known production is a Comic History of the United States, published in 1870 under the pseudonym Harry Scratchley.

== Personal life ==
He married, on October 29, 1863, Emmeline Catherine (née Dunn) Zimmerman, of Toronto, who survived him with four children. The former wife of Samuel Zimmerman, she was the daughter of Charles and Polly Dunn. A son, John Howard Sherwood, graduated Yale in 1890.

Sherwood died in Englewood, from pneumonia, on April 30, 1891, in his 73rd year. He had suffered from paralysis for many years before his death.

== Sources ==
This article incorporates public domain material from the 1891 Yale Obituary Record.
