= John Davis Pierce =

American minister, educator and politician (1797–1882)

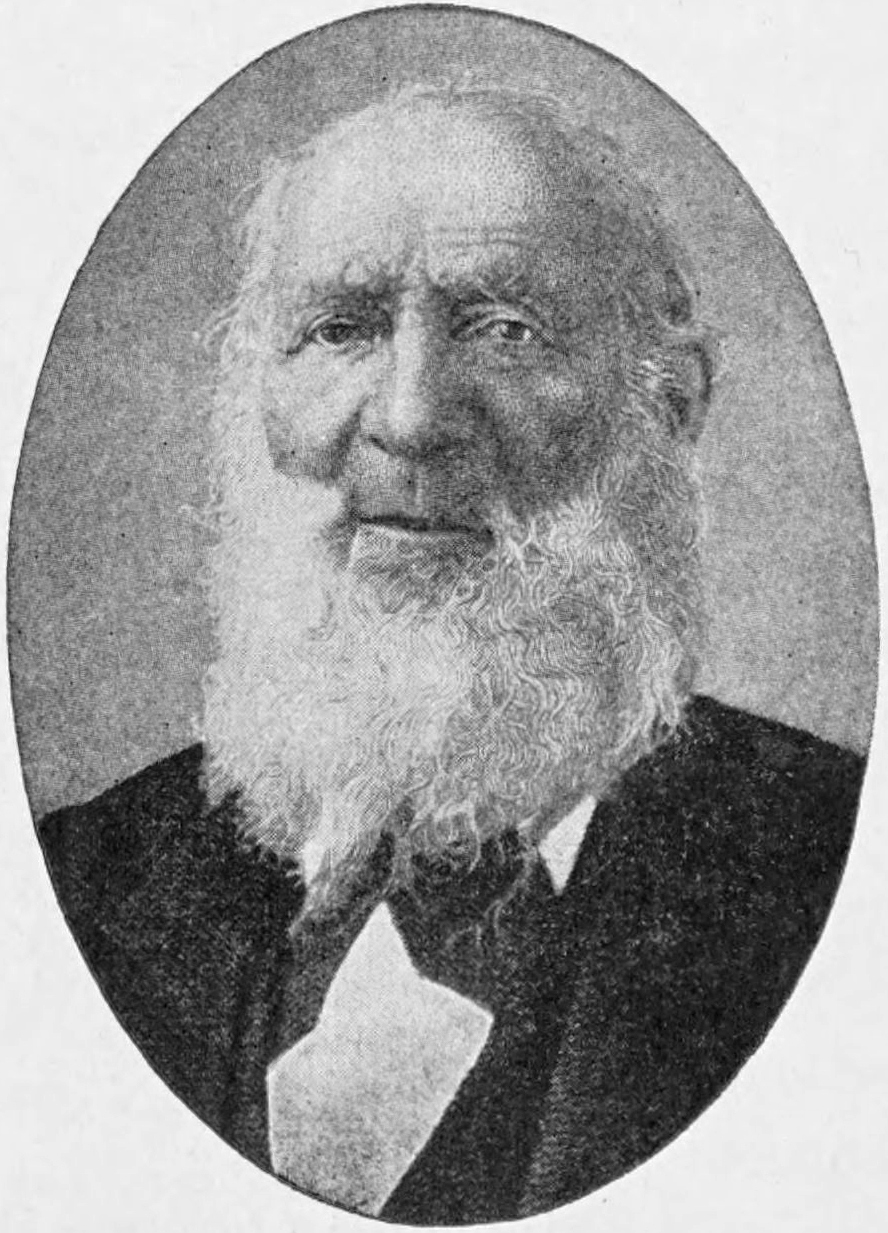
- Born: February 18, 1797; Chesterfield, New Hampshire, US
- Died: April 5, 1882 (aged 85); Medford, Massachusetts, US
- Education: Brown University; Princeton Theological Seminary
- Occupations: Congregationalist minister; state school superintendent; legislator
- Known for: Michigan public school system

John Davis Pierce (February 18, 1797 – April 5, 1882) was an American Congregationalist minister, educator and politician. He was Michigan's first superintendent of public schools, a position new to the United States, where he established Michigan's public school system. His work has been compared to that of Horace Mann's.

Before his public service career, he attended Brown University and Princeton Theological Seminary, and became an ordained minister of the Congregational Church. When he moved to Michigan as a missionary, he became involved in Michigan politics and ultimately designed the state's public school system as part of their organization for statehood. After his superintendency, he was elected to the state legislature and served on Michigan's 1850 constitutional convention before retiring to his farm outside Ypsilanti for the last thirty years of his life.

== Early life and career ==
We have started in the race of improvement with the fixed determination of extending the blessings of education to every child in the state. Within the past three years about 2,000 districts have been organized.

— Pierce writing to Horace Mann, 1839

John Davis Pierce was born February 18, 1797, in Chesterfield, New Hampshire. His father died when he was young, and his lack of money limited his education; By age 20, Pierce committed himself to 'self-education'. He later attended Brown University, graduating in 1822, and taught briefly before attending Princeton Theological Seminary. In 1825, he was ordained a minister of the Congregational church, and was hired as pastor in Sangerfield, New York, soon moving on to pastor in Goshen, Connecticut. But, as he was a Freemason, Pierce lost both those posts during the Anti-Masonic Party of the late 1820s.

Pierce married Millicent Estabrook on February 1, 1825.

He migrated to Michigan as a missionary, settling in Marshall, a frontier town, in 1831. He planned a public education system for Michigan as the territory readied itself to enter statehood, and served as Michigan's first superintendent of public instruction from 1836 to 1841, It was the first position of its kind in the United States. His objectives were many and far-reaching: he coordinated the state's elementary schools, created state school districts with individual libraries, set professional qualifications for teachers, sold public land for public education, and planned the creation of the University of Michigan. He founded the Great Lakes region's first professional education journal, The Journal of Education, and served as its editor from 1838 to 1840. A Brown University library exhibit calls Pierce "the Horace Mann of Michigan". Pierce's vision and work combined common schools with a public university, which the Brown exhibit describes as an achievement that "surpass[es] Mann's in breadth and comprehensiveness".

Pierce returned to his pulpit in 1841. In 1847, he was elected to the Michigan House of Representatives, and was most notably involved with legislation opening Michigan's first normal school. He served on Michigan's 1850 constitutional convention before leaving state government. Other than his brief service as school superintendent for Washtenaw County from 1867 to 1868, Pierce lived his 30-year retirement on his farm outside Ypsilanti. In 1880, he and his wife moved to live under the care of their daughter in Medford, Massachusetts, where he died on April 5, 1882.

== Legacy ==
John D. Pierce Middle School in Grosse Pointe Park, Michigan, John D. Pierce Middle School in Redford, Michigan, and John D. Pierce Middle School in Waterford, Michigan, are all named for him.
