= Brooks Field (Michigan) =

Public use airport in Marshall, Michigan

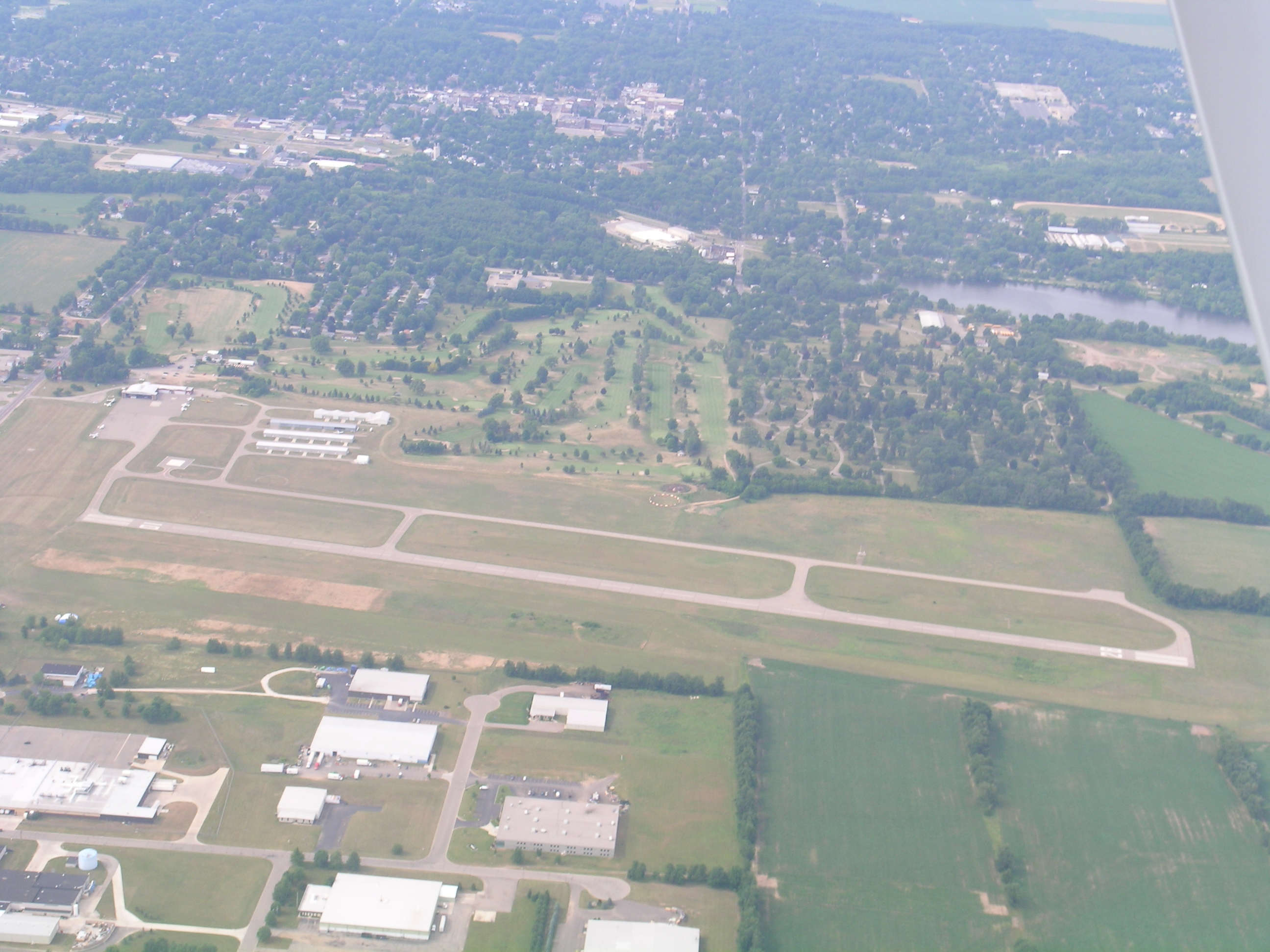
- IATA: none; ICAO: KRMY; FAA LID: RMY

Summary
- Airport type: Public
- Owner: City of Marshall
- Serves: Marshall, Michigan
- Time zone: UTC−05:00 (-5)
  - Summer (DST): UTC−04:00 (-4)
- Elevation AMSL: 941 ft (287 m)
- Coordinates: 42°15′04″N 084°57′20″W

Map
- Location of airport in Michigan RMY (the United States)

Runways
Direction	Length		Surface
Direction	ft	m	Surface
10/28	3,501	1,067	Asphalt

Helipads
Number	Length		Surface
Number	ft	m	Surface
H1	50	15	Concrete

Statistics (2007)
- Aircraft operations: 8400
- Based aircraft: 36
- Source: Federal Aviation Administration

Brooks Field (ICAO: KRMY, FAA LID: RMY) is a city-owned, public-use airport located one nautical mile (1.9 km) south of the central business district of Marshall, a city in Calhoun County, Michigan, United States. Brooks Field was officially dedicated in 1931, although the first plane landed there on November 9, 1929.

Although many U.S. airports use the same three-letter location identifier from the Federal Aviation Administration (FAA) and International Air Transport Association (IATA), this airport is assigned RMY by the FAA and no designation from IATA. It is included in the FAA National Plan of Integrated Airport Systems for 2017–2021, in which it is categorized as a local general aviation facility.

== Facilities and aircraft ==
Brooks Field covers an area of 170 acres (69 ha) at an elevation of 941 feet (287 m) above mean sea level. It has one runway designated 10/28 with an asphalt surface measuring 3,501 by 75 feet (1,067 by 23 m). It also has a one helipad designated H1 with a concrete surface measuring 50 by 50 feet (15 by 15 m). The airport is staffed from 8AM until dusk, except for major holidays.

The airport has a fixed-base operator that offers aircraft parking, lounges, and avgas.

For the 12-month period ending December 31, 2020, the airport had 8,400 operations, an average of 23 per day. This included almost 100% general aviation and <1% military. At that time there were 36 aircraft based on the field, including 31 single-engine airplanes, 4 gliders, and 1 multi-engine airplane.

=== Transit ===
The closest highway is Interstate 69 (I-69), which is approximately two miles (3.2 km) west of the airport. I-94 is also very close to the airport. The airport is accessible by road from Kalamazoo Street.

== See also ==
- List of airports in Michigan
