= Cecil Jay =

American painter

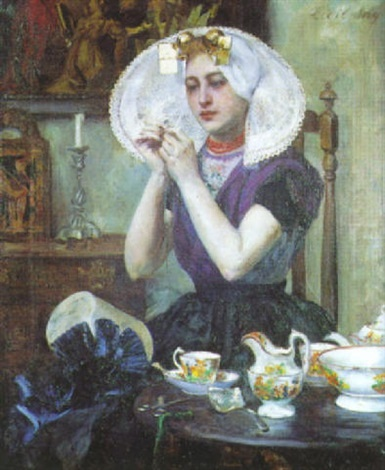
La dentelliere, c. 1900

Cecil Jay (1883–1954) was an Anglo-American painter, mainly of portraits and miniatures.

A native of London, Jay received her early instruction there, first at the Royal College of Art and later under Hubert von Herkomer before traveling to the Netherlands. Here she studied with the American expatriate George Hitchcock, marrying him in 1905. After he died in 1913, she took American citizenship. After World War I, she married a retired British civil servant, Oliver Vassall Calder, with whom she lived in Oxford. She died in Oxford.

Jay was active mostly at the beginning of the twentieth century, exhibiting at the Royal Academy from 1902 until 1928 and showing at the Royal Miniature Society in 1904. She also exhibited at the Paris Salon from 1907 to 1913, and her work was shown at the Walker Art Gallery. Jay also had an association with the National Academy of Design, appearing in the 1914 annual exhibition there and establishing the George Hitchcock Landscape in Sunlight Prize with a bequest; the latter has been awarded sporadically since 1975. She won a silver medal for miniatures at the Panama–Pacific International Exposition in 1915, winning honorable mention for her oil paintings there, and was a member of the New York Watercolor Club as well. Jay She also produced a handful of genre paintings, many with Dutch themes.

Jay's portrait of Hitchcock is in the collections of the National Academy. She is also represented in the collections of the Walker Art Gallery.
