= Adam Crosswhite =

Slavery survivor (1799–1878)

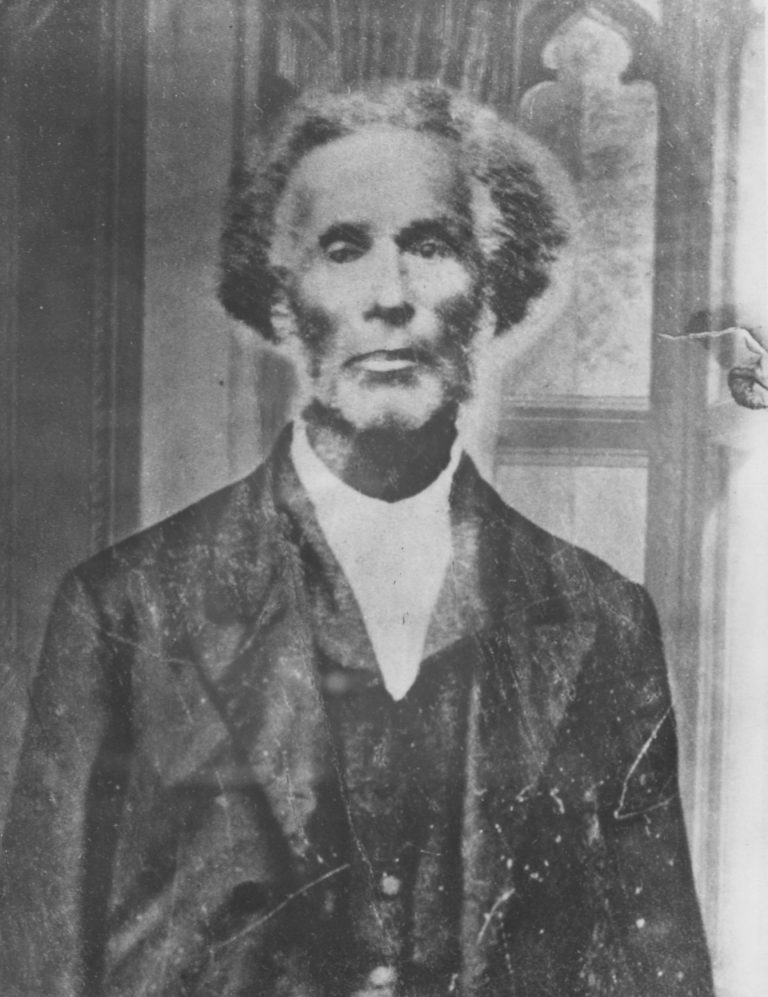
- Born: October 17, 1799; Bourbon County, Kentucky, US
- Died: January 23, 1878 (aged 78); Marshall, Michigan, US
- Known for: Crosswhite Affair

Adam Crosswhite (1799–1878) was a former slave who fled slavery along the Underground Railroad and settled in Marshall, Michigan. In 1847, slavers from Kentucky came to Michigan to kidnap African Americans and return them to slavery in Kentucky. Citizens of the town surrounded the Crosswhites' house and prevented them from being abducted. The Crosswhites fled to Canada, and their former owner, Francis Giltner, filed a suit, Giltner vs. Gorham et al., against residents of Marshall. Giltner won the case and was compensated for the loss of the Crosswhite family. After the Civil War, Crosswhite returned to Marshall, where he lived the rest of his life.

== Slavery ==
Adam Crosswhite was born into slavery on October 17, 1799, in Bourbon County, Kentucky. His mother was an enslaved woman, and his father was his first owner. (Note: The Underground Railroad book incorrectly states that Crosswhite's father was Francis Giltner and was born in Carroll County, Kentucky.) His father gave him to his paternal aunt, Miss Crosswhite when he was a boy. His aunt married Ned Stone, a slave dealer, who later sold him for $200 to a man with the Troutman surname. When he was 20, Crosswhite was traded to Francis Giltner of Carroll County, Kentucky. Two years later, he married a woman named Sarah. Crosswhite fathered seven children by 1844. When he learned that Giltner intended to sell his eldest child, Crosswhite made plans to runaway with Sarah and four children in August 1843. (Note: The Notable Kentuckian African American database states that they ran away to Michigan in 1844.)

== Flight ==
They traveled by skiff to Madison, Indiana, where they were met by conductors on the Underground Railroad. Traveling further north to Newport, Indiana, they were taken in and hidden by Quakers for several days because slave catchers were closing in on them. A local man portrayed himself as a slave hunter and offered to guide the Kentuckians to the hiding place of the Crosswhite family. He led them into a dense swamp and made an excuse to leave them. The slave catchers were lost in the woods all night. The family split up, with Sarah and two of their younger children traveling together and Crosswhite pushing on to southern Michigan. They met up five weeks later and settled in Marshall, Michigan, where there was an African-American community of about 50 people, most of whom fled Kentucky to escape slavery. They met up with some friends from Kentucky, and Crosswhite was offered employment. He purchased a house on the edge of town on East Mansion Street. His children attended the district school. His fifth child was born free in Michigan.

== Attempted recapture ==
Fearing that he and his family would be captured and returned to slavery, he arranged with his neighbors that he would signal that his family was in danger by firing a single shot from a gun.

Giltner hired Francis Troutman as his agent to locate the Crosswhites, who with the help of a spy from Kalamazoo, found them in Marshall on December 23, 1846. On January 26, 1847, Crosswhite had been notified that his family was in jeopardy. At 4:00 the following morning, he saw four heavily armed men from Kentucky heading toward his house, and he fired a single warning shot. One of the men was Francis Troutman, Giltner's grandson (Note: Troutman is said to be Giltner's grandson in the legal case against Gorman and others. He is also said to have been Giltner's nephew.) and another was David Giltner, Giltner's son. The other two men were John S. Lee and Franklin Ford. The Kentuckians were accompanied by Deputy Sheriff Harvey M. Dickson of Marshall, who was to escort the men to the Crosswhite residence to oversee enforcement of the Fugitive Slave Act of 1793. With proof of ownership, the Crosswhites were expected to be returned to Francis Giltner.

Having heard the shot, Moses Patterson rode his horse through town while ringing his bell and shouting the alarm to the town's residents that the Crosswhites were in danger. Woken up by the local auction-bell ringer, the people of Marshall headed for the Crosswhites' residence.

In the meantime, Sarah was behind a barricaded door, and their children had found hiding places in the house. Crosswhite stood in front of his house, attempting to stop the slave catchers. Troutman, who claimed to be Giltner's agent and attorney, stated that he was authorized to return the Crosswhites to their former slaveholder. He broke into the door of the Crosswhites' house. Troutman intended to take the Crosswhite family, except for the youngest child who was born free. Troutman stated that the first step was to meet before a local magistrate, Squire Sherman, where Troutman would offer proof that Francis Giltner owned the Crosswhites. Troutman remained at the house with Crosswhite's family while Crosswhite left for the village to retain an attorney. Troutman tried to convince Sarah to return with him to Kentucky. According to Sarah and Troutman, Troutman said, "Well if you and your husband want to stay, just let me take your children back". (Note: Crosswhite and one of his sons were said to have sought out the local sheriff, but Sheriff Dickson had already arrived with the Kentuckians at 4:00 in the morning.) Sarah stated that she would rather die than give up her children.

During Crosswhite's absence, residents of Marshall began to arrive at his house, starting with Planter Morse, an African American, who threatened to fight to save the family from being abducted. When Crosswhite returned, Morse encouraged him to fight being abducted. More black people arrived, and they threatened the Kentuckians with bodily harm if they tried to take the Crosswhites from their home.

The group grew to 100 black and white neighbors, or more than 150 people. Later in the morning, Charles T. Gorham, a successful banker in Marshall, and several other leading citizens arrived to support and help resolve the dispute. Troutman was overwhelmed by the number of Marshall residents who prevented the Crosswhites from being abducted. They argued that Michigan was a free state under the Northwest Ordinance of 1787 and the state constitution. Some stated that it was the Crosswhites' God-given right to be free.

Urged on, Crosswhite decided to have the sheriff arrest Troutman and the other Kentuckians for breaking into his house and causing a disturbance. Local attorney John Van Arman represented the Crosswhites, giving a "scathing arraignment of the defendants" for breaking down the door, brandishing weapons, and attempting to separate the youngest child from its family. The slave catchers were convicted and fined $100. Troutman was to be tried in a higher court.

Francis Giltner decided that, since he could not recapture the Crosswhite family, he sued Marshall residents that had protected the Crosswhites, including Charles T. Gorham. Giltner filed for $4,500 (equivalent to $167,452 in 2025) in damages. The case Giltner v. Gorham et al. was held at the U.S. Circuit Court of Michigan beginning on July 21, 1848. During the trial, Giltner's witnesses attested to the value of the Crosswhite family members. In October 1848, Crosswhite and his wife gave their depositions in Chatham. The trial was dismissed when the jurors could not agree. A second trial began on November 10 of that year, which resulted in fines of $1,925 (equivalent to $71,632 in 2025) and costs, but there was no award for the value of the Crosswhites. (Note: It was also said that Giltner was awarded $2,752 or $4,800 (equivalent to $165,857 in 2025) for the value his slaves.) Abolitionists, including Zachariah Chandler and Alanson Sheley, paid a large portion of the fine.

== Freedom ==
Aided by Marshall residents, the Crosswhites were hidden and transported through the night to Jackson, where they boarded a train early in the morning. George Ingersoll traveled with the family, ensuring that they safely boarded the train to Detroit and made it across the Detroit River to Windsor, Ontario.

Crosswhite and his family lived in Chatham, Ontario and then in North Buxton, which was the final destination for many former enslaved people where they would be free.

== Later years ==
Crosswhite's grave at Oakridge Cemetery

The Crosswhite family returned to Marshall after the end of the Civil War. Crosswhite died on January 23, 1878, and the Crosswhites are interred at the Oakridge Cemetery in Marshall.

== Legacy ==
The Crosswhite affair received national attention, and pro-slavery factions called for a stricter fugitive law, which led to the enactment of the Fugitive Slave Act of 1850. As a result, there was a sterner gulf between the anti-slavery and pro-slavery movements. George M. Fuller wrote of the significance of the act, "perhaps as much as the Kansas-Nebraska Bill, aroused the North to resistance, brought together the anti-slavery Democrats, Whigs, Free-Soilers, into a new party, the Republican party, and that initiated the train of circumstances which led to the triumph of that party in 1860 and the preservation of the Union after four years of war."

== Popular culture ==
- Polacco, Patricia (2009). January's Sparrow. Penguin. ISBN 978-0-399-25077-4. — Juvenile literature about the Crosswhite family
- The Adam Crosswhite affair is documented at the Buxton National Historic Site and Museum in Ontario, Canada.
- A historical marker in his name was established at the site of his house 42°16′22″N 84°56′55″W. Erected in 1923 by the Calhoun County Historical Society, it states:

Near This Spot
900 Feet North, 8° East
Stood The Cabin
Of
Adam Crosswhite
The Scene Of An Attempted
Slave Recovery
January 26, 1847
This Affair
With Others Of Like Nature
Led To The Passing Of The
Fugitive Slave Law
And Ultimately To
Civil War

== Bibliography ==
- "Case No. 5,453 Glintner v. Gorham et al.". The Federal Cases: Comprising Cases Argued and Determined in the Circuit and District Courts of the United States. West Publishing Company. 1895.
- Dannett, Sylvia G. L. (1964). Profiles of Negro Womanhood. Yonkers, New York: Educational Heritage.
- Farmer, Jeremy M. (Autumn 2016). "The Crosswhite Family Escapes from Slavery" (PDF). National Archives Researcher News. Washington, D.C.: National Archives and Records Administration.
- Gardner, Washington (1913). History of Calhoun county, Michigan : a narrative account of its historical progress, its people, and its principle interests. Chicago: Lewis Publishing Company.
