= Marshall Historic District =

Historic district in Michigan, United States

- Marshall Michigan Historic Landmark District
- U.S. National Register of Historic Places
- U.S. National Historic Landmark District
- Michigan State Historic Site
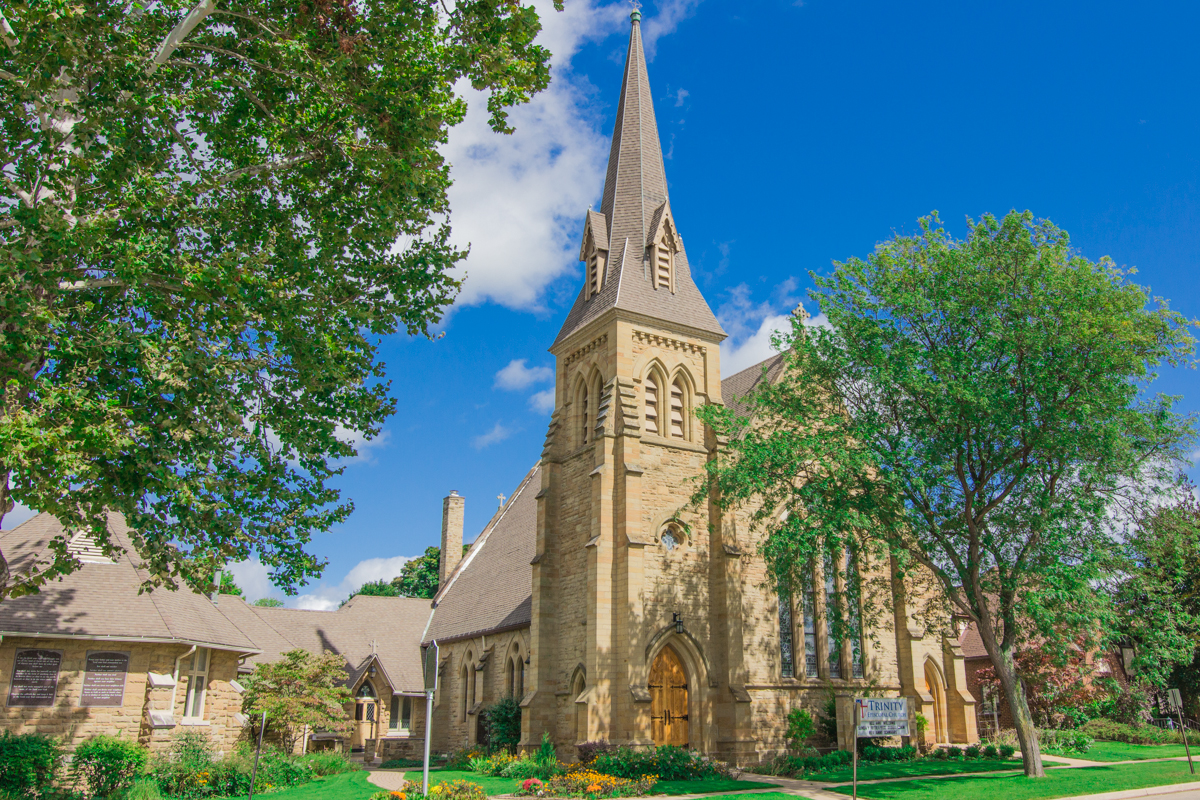
- Trinity Episcopal Church

- Location within Michigan Location within the United States
- Interactive map
- Location: Roughly bounded by Plum St., East Dr., Forest St. and Hanover St., Marshall, Michigan
- Coordinates: 42°16′27″N 84°57′48″W
- Area: 325 acres (132 ha)
- Architectural style: Mid 19th Century Revival, Late Victorian, Late 19th And 20th Century Revivals
- NRHP reference No.: 91002053

Significant dates
- Added to NRHP: July 17, 1991
- Designated NHLD: July 17, 1991

The Marshall Historic District is a National Historic Landmark District that encompasses a significant portion of the central residential and commercial area of Marshall, Michigan. The district is nationally significant for the remarkably unified and well-preserved street plan, architecture, and public infrastructure, one of the largest such concentrations in the nation. It was designated a National Historic Landmark in 1991.

== Description and history ==
The area that is now Marshall was settled in 1831 by Sidney Ketchum, a land speculator from New York who envisioned it as a future capital city for the future state of Michigan. He chose the site for its location on the Kalamazoo River and its proximity to the main road between Detroit and Chicago. The city was settled over the next decade by well-educated migrants from the northeastern United States, who brought with them a sense of building architecture and town planning from the region. The city was laid out in a rectilinear grid, and the early buildings were typically Greek Revival, some in a sophisticated high style. Growth was at first fueled by the belief that the community would be chosen as the state capital, but Lansing was chosen in 1847. Later growth came courtesy of industry and railroad transportation links, including the main rail yard of the Michigan Central Railroad.

The city's economic prosperity continued until the 1870s, when the Michigan Central closed its rail yard. During this period, construction continued apace, with high-quality but often conservative versions of the popular Italianate and Gothic Revival styles. In the early 20th century, the city continued at a lower level of prosperity, but the level of architectural quality of new Colonial and Classical Revival buildings continued to be high. The effect of this growth is that there is now a high quality cross-section of architectural styles of the 19th and early 20th centuries, including residential, civic, commercial, and religious buildings.

The historic district designated in 1991 is about 325 acres (132 ha) in size, and includes more than 750 historically significant buildings. It is roughly bounded on the north by Forest Street, the west by Plum Street, the south by Hanover Street, and the east by East Drive. This area includes the historic commercial, civic, and residential core of the city. Particularly notable buildings include the Hawaiian-inspired Italianate Honolulu House, the National House, an 1835 Greek Revival inn, and Wagner's Block, an imposing commercial Second Empire block on West Michigan Avenue.

== See also ==
- List of National Historic Landmarks in Michigan
- National Register of Historic Places listings in Calhoun County, Michigan
