= Marshall, Michigan =

- City
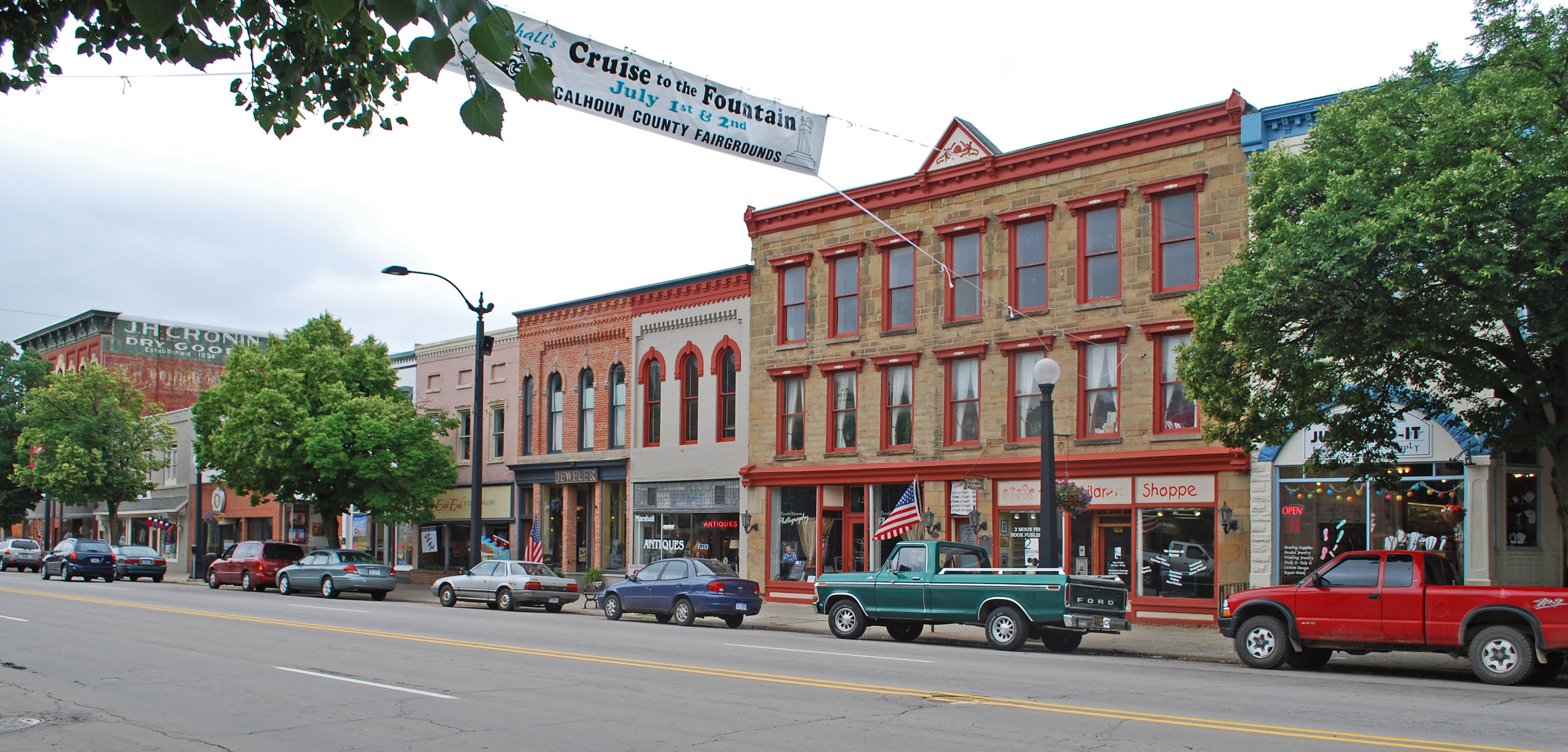
- Downtown Marshall

- Location of Marshall, Michigan
- Coordinates: 42°16′14″N 84°57′36″W
- Country: United States
- State: Michigan
- County: Calhoun
- Incorporated: 1836 (village); 1849 (city)

Government
  - Mayor: Scott Wolfersberger

Area
  - Total: 6.61 sq mi (17.12 km^{2})
  - Land: 6.49 sq mi (16.82 km^{2})
  - Water: 0.12 sq mi (0.30 km^{2})
- Elevation: 920 ft (280 m)

Population (2020)
  - Total: 6,822
  - Density: 1,050.7/sq mi (405.66/km^{2})
- Time zone: UTC-5 (Eastern (EST))
  - Summer (DST): UTC-4 (EDT)
- ZIP codes: 49068-49069
- Area code: 269
- FIPS code: 26-51940
- GNIS feature ID: 631630
- Website: cityofmarshall.com

Marshall is a city in and the county seat of Calhoun County, Michigan. The population was 6,822 at the 2020 census.

Marshall is best known for its cross-section of 19th- and early 20th-century architecture and as the future home of Ford Motor Company's BlueOval Battery Park. It has been referred to by the keeper of the National Register of Historic Places as a "virtual textbook of 19th-Century American architecture." Its historic center is the Marshall Historic District, one of the nation's largest architecturally significant National Historic Landmark Districts. The Landmark has over 850 buildings, including the Honolulu House.

== History ==
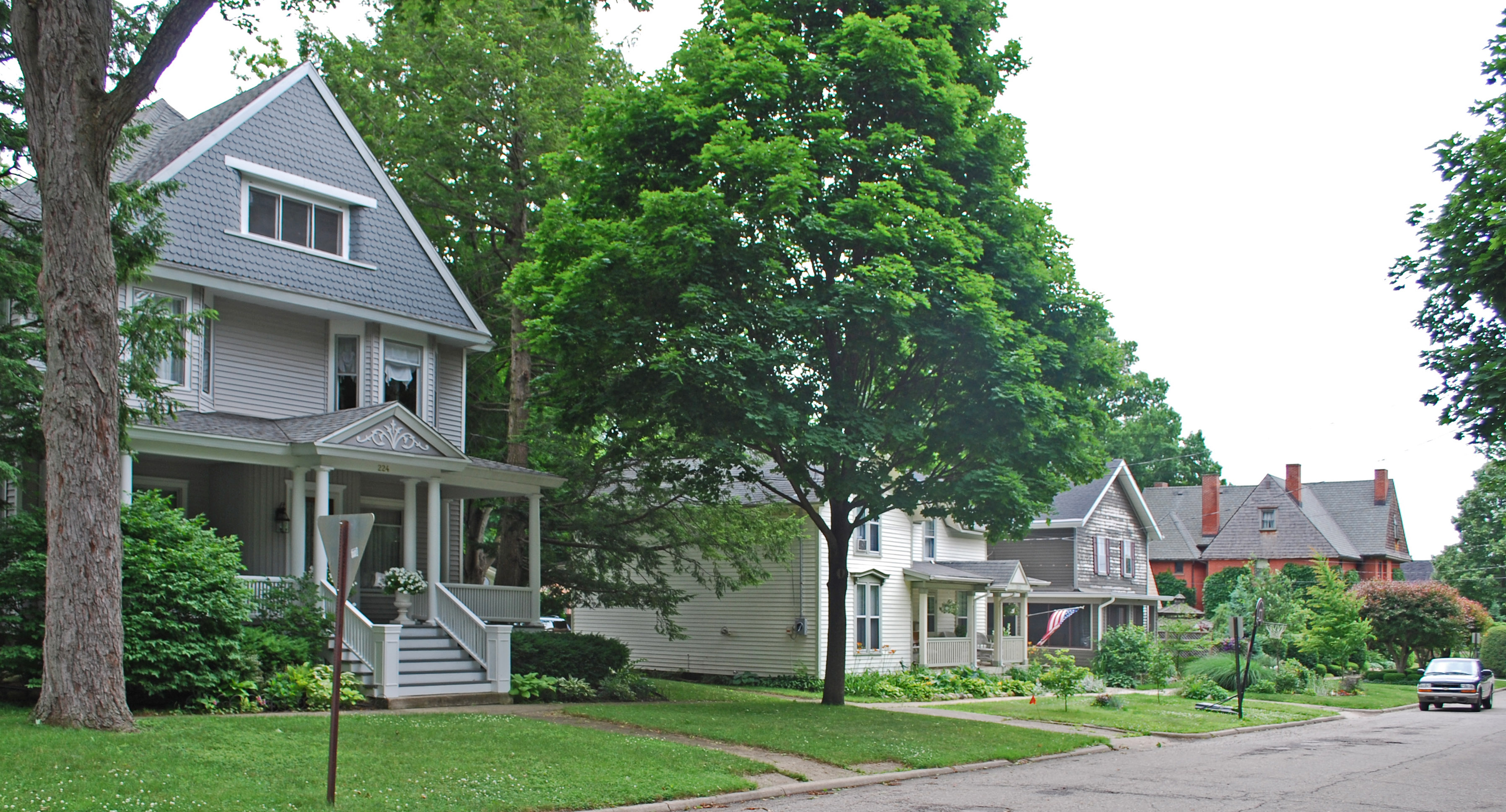

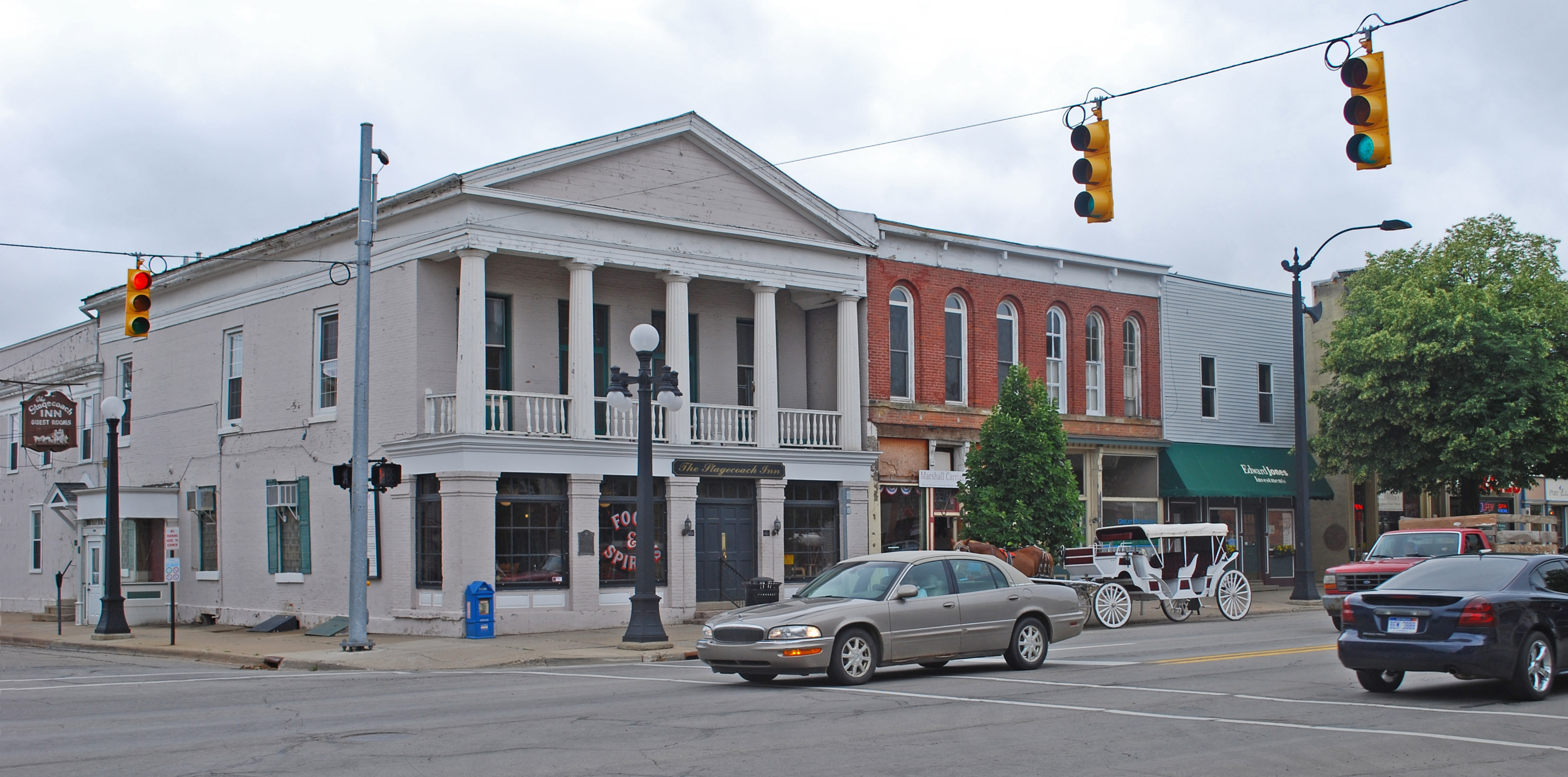

The town was founded by Sidney Ketchum (1797–1862) in 1830, a land surveyor born in Clinton County, New York, in conjunction with his brother, George Ketchum (1794-1853). The Ketchum brothers explored central lower Michigan in 1830, and in late 1830, Sidney Ketchum obtained government grants for the land on which most of Marshall now stands. The early settlers named the community in honor of Chief Justice of the United States John Marshall from Virginia—whom they greatly admired. This occurred five years before Marshall's death and thus was the first of dozens of communities and counties named for him. The village of Marshall was incorporated March 28, 1836.

Marshall was thought to be the frontrunner for state capital, so much so that a Governor's Mansion was built. However, the town lost, along with Lyons, Michigan, by a Yea/Nay vote count of 29-32 against Lansing's 35-27 (11 vote difference). In the years thereafter, Marshall became known for its patent medicine industry until the Pure Drug Act of 1906. Marshall was involved in the Underground Railroad. When escaped slave Adam Crosswhite fled Kentucky and settled in Marshall with his wife and three children, the people of the town hid him from the posse sent to retrieve him. Those involved were tried in Federal Court and found guilty of denying a man his rightful property. This case and others like it caused the Fugitive Slave Act of 1850 to be pushed through Congress.

=== Stand against slavery ===
In 1843, Adam Crosswhite, his wife Sarah and their four children ran away from Francis Giltner's plantation in Hunter's Bottom, Carroll County, Kentucky because the Crosswhites learned that one of their four children was to be sold. The Crosswhites made the tough journey north through Indiana along the Underground Railroad, beginning in Madison, Indiana. They finally settled in Marshall, where they were accepted, and Adam worked and built a cabin.

In response to increasing numbers of runaway slaves, a coalition of slave owners in the north central counties and the Bluegrass region of Kentucky organized to recover the runaways. In January 1846, Francis Giltner's son David Giltner and three others went to Marshall to capture the Crosswhite family.

On the morning of January 26, 1847, as the slave catchers and a local deputy sheriff were pounding on Adam's door, his neighbors heard the noise and came running. The cry of "slave catchers!" was yelled through the streets of Marshall. Soon, over 100 people surrounded the Crosswhite home.

Threats were shouted back and forth. One of the slave catchers began to demand that people in the crowd give him their names. They were proud to tell him and even told him the correct spelling. Each name was written down in a little book. Finally, the deputy sheriff, swayed by the crowd's opinion, decided he should arrest the men from Kentucky instead. Marshall townspeople hid the Crosswhites in the attic of George Ingersoll's mill. By the time the slave catchers could post bond and get out of jail, Isaac Jacobs, the hostler at the Marshall House, had hired a covered wagon and driven the Crosswhites to Jackson where they boarded a train to Detroit and then crossed over into Canada.

The Giltners sued some of the people from Marshall for damages in what is known in federal records as the Giltner v. Gorham case. It was tried in the federal court in Detroit. The Giltner v Gorham case resulted in two trials in federal court in Detroit, the first trial ending in a hung jury. At the conclusion of the second trial, the sole remaining defendant in the case, local banker Charles T. Gorham, was ordered to pay the value of the slaves plus court costs. To curry political favor, Detroit entrepreneur Zachariah Chandler supposedly stepped in to pay these costs on Gorham's behalf.

Because of the Crosswhite Affair and many others like it, Sen. Henry Clay from Kentucky pushed a new law through Congress in 1850 known as the Fugitive Slave Law, which made it very risky for anyone to help an escaped slave.

Two Marshall citizens Rev. John D. Pierce and lawyer Isaac E. Crary, innovated the Michigan school system and established it as part of the state constitution. Their method and format were later adopted by all the states in the old Northwest Territory and became the foundation for the Morrill Land-Grant Act in 1862, which established schools like Michigan State University all over the country. Pierce became the country's first state superintendent of public instruction and Crary Michigan's first member of the U.S. House.

=== Railroad significance ===
The first railroad labor union in the U.S., the Brotherhood of the Footboard (later renamed the Brotherhood of Locomotive Engineers and Trainmen), was formed in Marshall in 1863. Marshall was one of the only stops between Chicago and Detroit and became known as "Chicken Pie City" because the only food that could be eaten in the short time that it took to cool and switch engines was a chicken pie. A replica of the city's roundhouse can be seen at the Greenfield Village outdoor living history museum in Dearborn, Michigan.

=== Enbridge oil spill ===
In July 2010, an oil pipeline owned by Enbridge Energy ruptured, spilling more than 850,000 gallons of crude oil into Talmadge Creek and the Kalamazoo River. The event received national attention as it was, at the time, the largest oil spill in the interior United States. The event was known as the Kalamazoo River Oil Spill.

In 2012, the U.S. National Transportation Safety Board stated that the Enbridge oil spill in the Kalamazoo River near Marshall was the costliest onshore cleanup in American history.

=== Industrial development ===
In 1968, a large tract of land in Marshall Township, approximately 800 acres, was rezoned to D-2 Park Industrial. The rezoning was sought by Flint industrial real estate developer Robert Gerholz. Gerholtz, a former president of the United States Chamber of Commerce, chose the property because of 4 advantages: 1) proximity to the I-94 & I-69 interchange, 2) access to the railroad, 3) access to hard surface road open to industrial truck travel year-round, and 4) proximity to the Kalamazoo River. Over 140 people turned out for rezoning hearing. It was pointed out at the hearing that the 800 acres fully developed with industry could furnish a 100-million-dollar tax base which was about 3 times the tax base was at that time. Among the people at the hearing were representatives from Marshall City Schools, city and county officials, county road commission, Marshall businesses, and manufacturing plants including Consumers Power Company.

In the years after the rezoning there was regular interest in developing the parcel for a large industrial development. In January 1997 the Gerholtz property was recognized by the Marshall Chamber of Commerce as having "statewide and national attention as one of the best locations in Michigan for large scale industrial development." Volkswagen AG expressed interest in developing a manufacturing plant on the Gerholtz property in 2008. Accordingly, the Marshall City attorney obtained several options for property surrounding the larger parcel as would be needed for the preliminary site plannings as the Gerholtz property alone was not large enough. A lack of short-term site readiness for construction caused Volkswagen to shift attention to other potential development.

In late 2021 the State of Michigan pushed for the creation of a 100-million-dollar fund for industrial development on large tracts of land after Tennessee and Kentucky landed $11.4 billion in investments from the Ford Motor Company and a battery manufacturer. The site was the subject of planning, and it was anticipated that these funds would be used to develop an industrial master plan and traffic impact studies.

In September 2022, the Marshall Area Economic Development Alliance (MAEDA) and the Michigan Economic Development Corporation began promoting the "Marshall Megasite" to industrial manufacturers but did not disclose their plan to the general public. Notices were not sent to Marshall Township residents immediately adjacent to on in close proximity to the project. At the time the proposed development area encompassed up to 1,600 acres of rural land (owned by separate landowners and just under 800 acres of which had previously been zoned D-2 Park Industrial) located in Marshall Township just outside Marshall's city limits. The move was controversial as the land was not yet zoned for heavy industry with the majority, over 1000 acres was zoned agricultural.

Marshall Township Residents were informed that a large industrial project was to take place in their community via the announcement of PA 425 Land Transfers to take place in January 2023. There was vocal public opposition to the land transfers, which would take 1,900 acres off of the Marshall Township Tax rolls and put them on the City of Marshall Tax rolls of which a percentage would go back to Marshall Township per the Master PA 425. The transfer enabled the megasite to have access to city utilities such as water and electricity. The Marshall Township Board of Supervisors voted 4 to 1 for the PA 425 land transfers. The Marshall City Council voted for the transfer as well, although there was significant public opposition to the project.

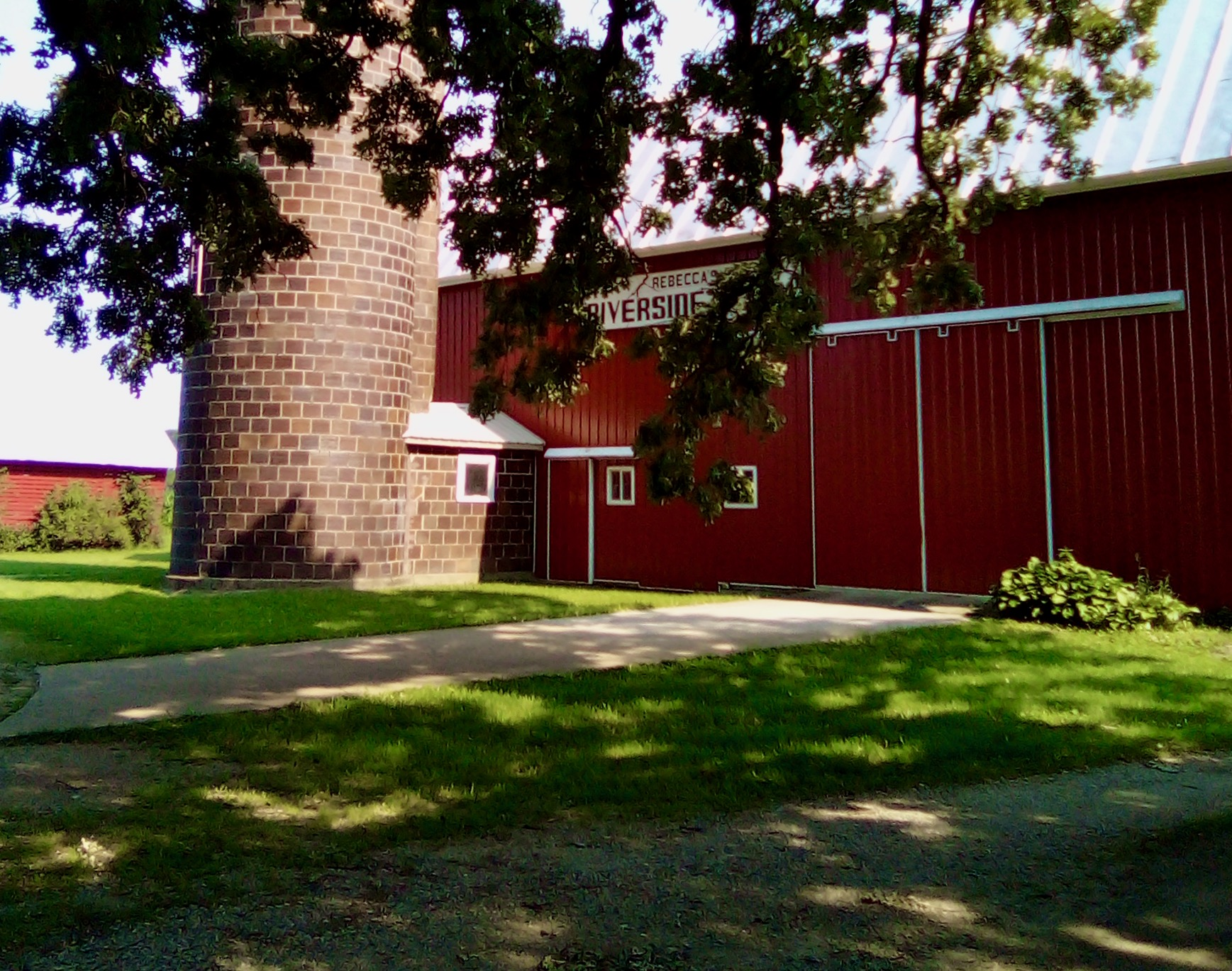
Located on the Marshall Megasite

In February 2023, Governor Gretchen Whitmer and Ford Motor Company announced the Marshall Megasite would become the site of Ford BlueOval Battery Park. The zoning changes on the property to allow for heavy industry were not made until May 1, 2023 by the Marshall City Council. Residents filed a petition for referendum on the zoning and their petition was rejected by the Marshall City Clerk and the Marshall City Council Members. In June 2023, a lawsuit was filed against the City by the ballot committee named "Committee for Marshall-Not the Megasite" The lawsuit was dismissed by the Circuit Court in early January 2024. The Committee for Marshall-Not the Megasite filed an appeal in March 2024. This committee was countersued by a committee with ties to Governor Whitmer's campaign committee.

== Geography ==
According to the United States Census Bureau, the city has a total area of 6.40 square miles (16.58 km^{2}), of which 6.28 square miles (16.27 km^{2}) is land and 0.12 square miles (0.31 km^{2}) is water.

== Demographics ==
Historical population
Census	Pop.	Note	%±
1850	1,972		—
1870	4,925		—
1880	3,795		−22.9%
1890	3,968		4.6%
1900	4,370		10.1%
1910	4,236		−3.1%
1920	4,270		0.8%
1930	5,019		17.5%
1940	5,253		4.7%
1950	5,777		10.0%
1960	6,736		16.6%
1970	7,253		7.7%
1980	7,201		−0.7%
1990	6,891		−4.3%
2000	7,459		8.2%
2010	7,088		−5.0%
2020	6,822		−3.8%
Source: Census Bureau. Census 1960- 2000, 2010.

Marshall is part of the Battle Creek, Michigan Metropolitan Statistical Area.

=== 2020 census ===
As of the 2020 census, Marshall had a population of 6,822. The median age was 41.8 years. 20.7% of residents were under the age of 18 and 23.0% of residents were 65 years of age or older. For every 100 females there were 88.9 males, and for every 100 females age 18 and over there were 86.0 males age 18 and over.

95.3% of residents lived in urban areas, while 4.7% lived in rural areas.

There were 3,072 households in Marshall, of which 25.7% had children under the age of 18 living in them. Of all households, 40.1% were married-couple households, 19.2% were households with a male householder and no spouse or partner present, and 32.5% were households with a female householder and no spouse or partner present. About 36.4% of all households were made up of individuals and 17.9% had someone living alone who was 65 years of age or older.

There were 3,363 housing units, of which 8.7% were vacant. The homeowner vacancy rate was 1.4% and the rental vacancy rate was 11.2%.

Racial composition as of the 2020 census
Race	Number	Percent
White	6,176	90.5%
Black or African American	85	1.2%
American Indian and Alaska Native	25	0.4%
Asian	46	0.7%
Native Hawaiian and Other Pacific Islander	0	0.0%
Some other race	75	1.1%
Two or more races	415	6.1%
Hispanic or Latino (of any race)	297	4.4%

=== 2010 census ===
As of the census of 2010, there were 7,088 people, 3,092 households, and 1,840 families residing in the city. The population density was 1,128.7 inhabitants per square mile (435.8/km^{2}). There were 3,394 housing units at an average density of 540.4 per square mile (208.6/km^{2}). The racial makeup of the city was 95.1% White, 1.1% African American, 0.6% Native American, 0.7% Asian, 0.7% from other races, and 1.8% from two or more races. Hispanic or Latino of any race were 3.8% of the population.

There were 3,092 households, of which 30.0% had children under the age of 18 living with them, 43.2% were married couples living together, 11.9% had a female householder with no husband present, 4.5% had a male householder with no wife present, and 40.5% were non-families. 34.9% of all households were made up of individuals, and 15.8% had someone living alone who was 65 years of age or older. The average household size was 2.25 and the average family size was 2.90.

The median age in the city was 40.5 years. 24% of residents were under the age of 18; 7.8% were between the ages of 18 and 24; 23.8% were from 25 to 44; 26.3% were from 45 to 64; and 18.2% were 65 years of age or older. The gender makeup of the city was 47.5% male and 52.5% female.

=== 2000 census ===
As of the census of 2000, there were 7,459 people, 3,111 households, and 1,935 families residing in the city. The population density was 1,260.7 inhabitants per square mile (486.8/km^{2}). There were 3,353 housing units at an average density of 566.7 per square mile (218.8/km^{2}). The racial makeup of the city was 95.91% White, 0.32% African American, 0.43% Native American, 0.59% Asian, 0.99% from other races, and 1.76% from two or more races. Hispanic or Latino of any race were 3.16% of the population.

There were 3,111 households, out of which 30.9% had children under the age of 18 living with them, 48.5% were married couples living together, 10.0% had a female householder with no husband present, and 37.8% were non-families. 32.9% of all households were made up of individuals, and 15.0% had someone living alone who was 65 years of age or older. The average household size was 2.33 and the average family size was 2.98.

In the city, the population was spread out, with 25.0% under the age of 18, 7.3% from 18 to 24, 28.2% from 25 to 44, 21.2% from 45 to 64, and 18.3% who were 65 years of age or older. The median age was 38 years. For every 100 females, there were 86.0 males. For every 100 females age 18 and over, there were 81.2 males.

The median income for a household in the city was $41,171, and the median income for a family was $53,317. Males had a median income of $41,446 versus $30,398 for females. The per capita income for the city was $22,101. About 2.6% of families and 5.0% of the population were below the poverty line, including 3.2% of those under age 18 and 3.9% of those age 65 or over.

== Festivals ==
- The Calhoun County Fair is the oldest operating County Fair in Michigan. Operated by the Calhoun County Agricultural and Industrial Society, the fair takes place during the second week in August. Floral Hall, located on the grounds is the oldest fair building in the state. Marshall maintains its strong agricultural ties with a large number of students involved in FFA and 4-H.
- On the second weekend in June and first weekend in October, the Fiber Arts & Animals Festival is held. This festival has been held since 2005.

== Transportation ==
=== Major highways ===
- I-69, a north–south freeway connecting with Fort Wayne, Indiana, to the south and Lansing to the north.
- I-94, an east–west route connecting with Battle Creek and Kalamazoo on the west and Jackson and Detroit on the east.
- BL I-94 runs through downtown.
- M-96 runs westerly from Marshall through Battle Creek and on to Kalamazoo.
- M-227 has as its northern terminus at BL I-94 (Michigan Avenue) on the west side of Marshall, near I-69.

=== Public transportation ===
- The city of Marshall provides Demand responsive transport bus service during the week with no service provided on weekends or major holidays.
- Amtrak, the national passenger rail system, provides daily service to nearby Battle Creek, Michigan and Albion, Michigan, operating its Wolverine both directions between Chicago, Illinois and Pontiac, Michigan, via Detroit.

=== Airport ===
Brooks Field is a non-towered General Aviation airfield owned and operated by the city of Marshall. The airport features a single runway (10/28) 3500 x 75 feet, helipad, public and private hangars, lighted wind indicator, segmented circle, compass rose, and a tie down apron.

== Notable people ==
- Gwen Robinson Awsumb, mid-20th century politician and social activist
- John Bellairs, fantasy author best known for The House with a Clock in Its Walls
- Cyrus W. Cole, U.S. Navy officer with the rank of Rear Admiral
- Ryan A. Conklin, author and castmember of Real World: Brooklyn and Return To Duty
- Adam Gase, former head coach of the New York Jets, and the Miami Dolphins
- Homer Hazel, all-American college football player
- Jamie Hyneman, co-host of the TV series MythBusters
- Belle K. Maniates, novelist and short story writer
- Sharon Miller, professional golfer and winner of two LPGA Tour tournaments
- John Morse, professional golfer and PGA TOUR winner (1995 Hawaiian Open). Also won the 1990 Australian Open.
- Samuel W Hill, American surveyor, known for the phrase "What The Sam Hill".
- Shubael F. White (1841–1914), Michigan state senator and judge

== Notable businesses ==
- Dark Horse Brewery
- Honolulu House
- Oaklawn (Hospital & Medical Group) - currently the city's largest employer

== Museums and historical markers ==
- The second-largest U.S. Postal Service museum is in Marshall. Its 4,000 artifacts—including uniforms, rural carrier memorabilia, rural post office equipment, automobiles and sleds—are eclipsed only by the collection of the Smithsonian Institution Smithsonian National Postal Museum in Washington D.C. It was established in 1986, and is in the basement of the historical Schragg Marshall post office (named after Michael Schragg, a former postmaster) See U.S. Postal Museums.

There are many recognized Michigan historical markers in Marshall, including

- Adam Crosswhite
- American Museum of Magic
- Butler-Boyce House / W. D. Boyce
- Calhoun County Fair
- Capitol Hill School
- Charles T. Gorham
- First Baptist Church (Marshall)
- Governor's Mansion
- Grand Army of the Republic / The G. A. R. Hall
- Harold C. Brooks / Fitch Gorham Brooks House
- Hillside / Mary Miller
- Honolulu House
- Isaac Crary and John Pierce / State School System
- Isaac E. Crary House
- James A. Miner
- Jeremiah Cronin. Jr. House / John Bellairs
- John D. Pierce Homesite
- Ketchum Park
- Lieutenant George A. Woodruff
- Lockwood House / Lockwood Family
- Marshall Historic District
- Marshall Avenue Bridge
- National House
- The Old Stone Barn
- Oliver C. Comstock Jr.
- Pioneer School
- Postmasters / Howard F Young
- Railroad Union Birthplace
- Sam Hill House
- Samuel Coleman House
- Schellenberger Tavern
- Schuler's
- Sidney Ketchum / Marshall House
- Thomas J. O'Brien
- Trinity Episcopal Church / Montgomery Schuyler
- William W. Cook

== Sister cities ==
- Kōka, Shiga, Japan.
