= National Register of Historic Places listings in Calhoun County, Michigan =

Location of Calhoun County in Michigan

The following is a list of Registered Historic Places in Calhoun County, Michigan.

This National Park Service list is complete through NPS recent listings posted October 2, 2026.

	Name on the Register	Image	Date listed	Location	City or town	Description
1	12 Mile Road-Kalamazoo River Bridge	12 Mile Road-Kalamazoo River Bridge	December 22, 1999 (#99001610)	12 Mile Rd. over Kalamazoo River; 42°16′12″N 85°03′41″W	Marshall	
2	23 Mile Road-Kalamazoo River Bridge	23 Mile Road-Kalamazoo River Bridge	December 22, 1999 (#99001611)	23 Mile Rd. over Kalamazoo River; 42°16′06″N 84°50′52″W	Marengo	
3	Advent Historic District	Advent Historic District	June 30, 1994 (#94000623)	Roughly bounded by N. Washington Ave., Champion St., Hubbard St. and Greenwood Ave. 42°19′49″N 85°11′44″W	Battle Creek	
4	Adam C. Arnold Block	Adam C. Arnold Block	March 24, 1983 (#83000839)	12-14 E. State St. 42°19′09″N 85°10′54″W	Battle Creek	This building has been demolished.
5	Battle Creek City Hall	Battle Creek City Hall	April 5, 1984 (#84001377)	103 E. Michigan Ave. 42°19′00″N 85°10′46″W	Battle Creek	
6	Battle Creek Post Office	Battle Creek Post Office	August 21, 1972 (#72000597)	67 E. Michigan St. 42°19′02″N 85°10′48″W	Battle Creek	
7	Battle Creek Sanitarium	Battle Creek Sanitarium	July 30, 1974 (#74000980)	74 N. Washington St. 42°19′37″N 85°11′16″W	Battle Creek	Once known as Western Health Reform Institute. Listed as "Federal Center" originally, the name was changed in 2012 with a boundary increase (January 27, 2012)
8	Boys' Club Building	Boys' Club Building	May 19, 2004 (#04000457)	115 West St. 42°19′35″N 85°10′58″W	Battle Creek	
9	Harold C. Brooks House	Harold C. Brooks House	July 8, 1970 (#70000266)	310 N. Kalamazoo Ave. 42°16′28″N 84°57′50″W	Marshall	Boundary increase (added 1984-04-19): 310 N. Kalamazoo Ave. Also known as the Jabez S. Fitch House. Part of the Marshall Michigan Historic Landmark District.
10	James and Anne Atmore Bryant Farmstead†	James and Anne Atmore Bryant Farmstead†	June 20, 2002 (#02000667)	12557 L Dr. N. (Convis Township); 42°20′01″N 85°03′05″W	Wattles Park	
11	Camp Custer Veterans Administration Hospital-United States Veterans Hospital No. 100	Camp Custer Veterans Administration Hospital-United States Veterans Hospital No. 100	May 17, 2012 (#12000282)	5500 Armstrong Rd. 42°20′36″N 85°17′29″W	Battle Creek	
12	Capitol Hill School	Capitol Hill School	March 16, 1972 (#72000598)	603 Washington St. 42°15′52″N 84°57′07″W	Marshall	
13	Central National Tower	Central National Tower	March 20, 2008 (#08000218)	70 W. Michigan Ave. 42°19′17″N 85°11′03″W	Battle Creek	
14	City Hall Historic District	City Hall Historic District	April 4, 1996 (#96000366)	E. Michigan Ave., from Monroe to Jay Sts. 42°19′01″N 85°10′47″W	Battle Creek	
15	Cortright-Van Patten Mill	Cortright-Van Patten Mill	August 31, 1979 (#79001150)	109 Byron St. 42°08′47″N 84°48′10″W	Homer	Burned down completely in fire on May 16, 2010. The mill was in operation until the 1970s. In 1974 it was purchased by James L. Miller and converted into a dinner theater. John and Alice Blakemore bought the building in 1996 and opened it as a restaurant. In 2006, new owners Lance and Susan Cuffle opened a bar and restaurant and operated a seasonal haunted house.
16	Crossman-Withee Farm	Crossman-Withee Farm	September 28, 2026 (#100013433)	21560 H Drive N 42°18′17″N 84°52′32″W	Marengo Township	
17	Emporium	Emporium	August 9, 1979 (#79001151)	154-156 W. Michigan Ave. 42°16′19″N 84°57′35″W	Marshall	Part of the Marshall Michigan Historic Landmark District.
18	Gardner House	Gardner House	May 6, 1971 (#71000383)	509 S. Superior St. 42°14′30″N 84°45′10″W	Albion	
19	Governor's Mansion	Governor's Mansion	January 8, 1975 (#75000939)	621 S. Marshall Ave. 42°15′54″N 84°57′16″W	Marshall	
20	Homer Village Historic District	Homer Village Historic District	July 25, 1996 (#96000805)	Roughly bounded by Leigh, Burgess, Hamilton, School, and Byron Sts. 42°08′39″N 84°48′27″W	Homer	
21	Honolulu House†	Honolulu House†	July 8, 1970 (#70000267)	107 N. Kalamazoo St. 42°16′22″N 84°57′52″W	Marshall	Part of the Marshall Michigan Historic Landmark District.
22	Joy House	Joy House	April 19, 1972 (#72000599)	224 N. Kalamazoo Ave. 42°16′26″N 84°57′50″W	Marshall	Part of the Marshall Michigan Historic Landmark District.
23	W. K. Kellogg House	W. K. Kellogg House	April 18, 1985 (#85000838)	1 Monroe St. 42°19′10″N 85°10′47″W	Battle Creek	This house was originally located at 256 W. Van Buren St. In 1990, it was moved to the present location.
24	Isaac Lockwood House	Isaac Lockwood House	July 22, 1994 (#94000748)	14011 Verona Rd., Marshall Township; 42°17′32″N 85°01′23″W	Marshall	
25	Maple Street Historic District	Maple Street Historic District	July 25, 1996 (#96000806)	161-342 Capital Ave., NE. 42°19′22″N 85°10′23″W	Battle Creek	
26	Marshall Avenue Bridge	Marshall Avenue Bridge	September 24, 2001 (#01001021)	Marshall Ave. over Rice Cr. 42°16′02″N 84°57′15″W	Marshall	
27	Marshall Michigan Historic Landmark District	Marshall Michigan Historic Landmark District	July 17, 1991 (#91002053)	Roughly bounded by Plum St., East Dr., Forest St. and Hanover St. 42°16′27″N 84°57′48″W	Marshall	
28	Masonic Temple Building	Masonic Temple Building	September 29, 1988 (#88001836)	115 E. Green St. 42°16′17″N 84°57′29″W	Marshall	Part of the Marshall Michigan Historic Landmark District.
29	Merritt Woods Historic District	Merritt Woods Historic District	June 17, 1994 (#94000622)	Roughly bounded by Orchard, Emmett and Chestnut Sts. and northernmost parts of Woodmer Dr. and Crest Dr. 42°19′51″N 85°10′19″W	Battle Creek	
30	Milk Producers Company Barn		February 14, 2002 (#02000043)	47 S. Cass St. 42°19′24″N 85°11′38″W	Battle Creek	NARA ID# 25339028
31	National House	National House	January 3, 1978 (#78001493)	102 S. Parkview; 42°16′19″N 84°57′54″W	Marshall	Part of the Marshall Michigan Historic Landmark District.
32	Oakhill	Oakhill	December 31, 1974 (#74000981)	410 N. Eagle St. 42°16′38″N 84°57′42″W	Marshall	Part of the Marshall Michigan Historic Landmark District.
33	Old-Merchants National Bank and Trust Co. Building	Old-Merchants National Bank and Trust Co. Building	November 21, 2018 (#100002887)	25 W Michigan Ave. 42°19′12″N 85°10′59″W	Battle Creek	
34	Penn Central Railway Station	Penn Central Railway Station	April 16, 1971 (#71000384)	W. Van Buren; 42°19′17″N 85°10′54″W	Battle Creek	
35	Penniman Castle	Penniman Castle	May 2, 2001 (#01000457)	443 Main St. 42°18′21″N 85°10′12″W	Battle Creek	
36	Pine Creek Potawatomi Reservation	Pine Creek Potawatomi Reservation	March 30, 1973 (#73000946)	1485 Mno-Bmadzewen Way; 42°06′15″N 85°15′32″W	Fulton	
37	William Prindle Livery Stable	William Prindle Livery Stable	August 19, 1982 (#82002829)	323 W. Michigan Ave. 42°16′17″N 84°57′50″W	Marshall	Part of the Marshall Michigan Historic Landmark District.
38	Record Printing and Box Company Building	Record Printing and Box Company Building	July 22, 2019 (#100004225)	15 Carlyle St. 42°19′20″N 85°11′10″W	Battle Creek	
39	Eugene P. Robertson House	Eugene P. Robertson House	February 8, 1988 (#88000028)	412 S. Clinton St. 42°14′33″N 84°45′17″W	Albion	
40	Stonehall	Stonehall	June 28, 1972 (#72000600)	303 N. Kalamazoo St. 42°16′27″N 84°57′52″W	Marshall	Part of the Marshall Michigan Historic Landmark District.
41	Stow-Hasbrouck House†	Stow-Hasbrouck House†	December 2, 1993 (#93001361)	17051 16 Mile Rd., Convis Township; 42°20′34″N 84°59′05″W	Marshall	
42	Superior Street Commercial Historic District	Superior Street Commercial Historic District	August 18, 1997 (#97000626)	Roughly bounded by the Kalamazoo River, Cass, Elm, Eaton and Vine Sts. 42°14′40″N 84°45′13″W	Albion	
43	Van Buren Street Historic District	Van Buren Street Historic District	April 4, 1996 (#96000367)	Roughly, Van Buren St. from Capital and Cherry Sts. to Calhoun St. and North Ave. 42°19′22″N 85°10′51″W	Battle Creek	
44	Wagner's Block	Wagner's Block	October 7, 1971 (#71000385)	143 W. Michigan Ave. 42°16′18″N 84°57′38″W	Marshall	Part of the Marshall Michigan Historic Landmark District.
45	Wright-Brooks House	Wright-Brooks House	March 16, 1972 (#72000601)	122 N. High St. 42°16′22″N 84°57′20″W	Marshall	Part of the Marshall Michigan Historic Landmark District.

== Former listings ==
	Name on the Register	Image	Date listed	Date removed	Location	City or town	Description
1	Battle Creek Sanitarium	Battle Creek Sanitarium	October 4, 1978 (#78001492)	April 18, 1988	197 N. Washington Ave. 42°19′37″N 85°11′16″W	Battle Creek	The former Phelps Sanitarium was purchased by the Battle Creek Sanitarium. Also known as the Fieldstone Building. The building was demolished in 1985.
2	Roosevelt Community House	Roosevelt Community House	August 20, 2001 (#01000653)	November 5, 2011	117 Evergreen Rd. 42°19′51″N 85°15′49″W	Springfield	Building was demolished April, 2016
3	Frank and Dorothy Ward House	Frank and Dorothy Ward House	September 10, 2014 (#14000562)	April 27, 2026	257 Lakeshore Dr. 42°17′14″N 85°13′07″W	Battle Creek	This house was demolished in 2017.

== See also ==
- List of Michigan State Historic Sites in Calhoun County, Michigan
- National Register of Historic Places listings in Michigan
- Listings in neighboring counties: Barry, Branch, Eaton, Hillsdale, Jackson, Kalamazoo, St. Joseph
