= Kellogg House =

Kellogg House can refer to:

In the United States

(listed by state, then city/town)

- Gen. Martin Kellogg House, Newington, Connecticut, listed on the National Register of Historic Places (NRHP) in Hartford County
- Enos Kellogg House, Norwalk, Connecticut, listed on the NRHP in Fairfield County
- Miles and Elizabeth Smith Kellogg House near Winterset, Iowa, listed on the NRHP in Madison County
- Godfrey-Kellogg House, Bangor, Maine, listed on the NRHP in Penobscot County
- Elijah Kellogg House, Harpswell, Maine, listed on the NRHP in Cumberland County
- Kellogg-Warden House, Ann Arbor, Michigan, listed on the NRHP in Washtenaw County
- W. K. Kellogg House, Battle Creek, Michigan, listed on the NRHP in Calhoun County
- Frank B. Kellogg House, St. Paul, Minnesota, listed on the NRHP in Ramsey County
- J. Francis Kellogg House, Avon, New York, listed on the NRHP in Livingston County
- The Kellogg House, Cornwall, New York, listed on the NRHP in Orange County
- Kellogg House (Cincinnati, Ohio), listed on the NRHP in Hamilton County
- John Kellogg House and Barn, Madison, Ohio, listed on the NRHP in Lake County
- White-Kellogg House, Oregon City, Oregon, listed on the NRHP in Clackamas County
