= Joy House =

Joy House, or Joy Homestead or Joy Farm, may refer to:

== Places in the United States ==
- C. R. Joy House, Keokuk, Iowa, listed on the NRHP in Lee County, Iowa
- Joy House (Marshall, Michigan), listed on the NRHP in Calhoun County, Michigan
- Joy Farm, Silver Lake, New Hampshire, listed on the NRHP in Carroll County, New Hampshire
- Joy Homestead, Cranston, Rhode Island, listed on the NRHP in Providence County, Rhode Island

== Novel and film ==
- Joy House (novel), 1954 novel by Day Keene
- Joy House (film), 1964 film starring Jane Fonda and Alain Delon based on the 1954 novel

== See also ==
- Joye Cottage, Aiken, South Carolina, listed on the NRHP in Aiken County, South Carolina
