= Stonehall (disambiguation) =

Stonehall is a townland in County Westmeath, Ireland.

Stonehall may also refer to:

- Stonehall (Marshall, Michigan), historic home listed in the National Register of Historic Places listings in Calhoun County, Michigan

== Places ==
=== Republic of Ireland ===
- Stonehall former name for the parish of Kilcornan Co Limerick.
- Stonehall (civil parish), a civil parish in the barony of Corkaree, County Westmeath
- Stonehall, County Meath, a townland in Trim civil parish, barony of Lower Moyfenrath, County Meath
- Stonehall, County Sligo (a.k.a. Carrownageeragh), a townland in Ballysadare civil parish, barony of Leyny, County Sligo

=== England ===
- Two locations in Kent and Worcestershire
