= Community House =

Community House may refer to:

== South Africa ==
- Community House (Salt River, Cape Town), a historic site and provincial heritage site

== United States ==
(by state then city)

- Redbone Community House, Barnesville, Georgia
- Cornelia Community House, Cornelia, listed on the NRHP in Habersham County, Georgia
- Community House (Winnetka, Illinois), NRHP-listed
- Whiting Memorial Community House, Whiting; NRHP-listed
- Community House (Hamilton, Massachusetts), NRHP-listed
- Community House (Manhattan, Kansas), listed on the NRHP in Riley County
- Dexter Community House, Dexter; NRHP-listed
- Milliken Memorial Community House, Elkton, Kentucky
- Sharp Street Memorial United Methodist Church and Community House, Baltimore, Maryland
- Mills Community House, Benzonia, Michigan
- Roosevelt Community House, Springfield, Michigan; NRHP-listed
- Community House (Louisville, Mississippi), NRHP-listed
- Fort Sumner Community House, Fort Sumner, New Mexico; NRHP-listed
- Congregation B'nai Jeshurun Synagogue and Community House, New York City
- Hamilton Park Community Houses, Staten Island, New York
- St. Bartholomew's Church and Community House, New York City
- Red Oak Community House, Red Oak, North Carolina; NRHP-listed
- Rose Hill and Community House, Bay Village, listed on the NRHP in Cuyahoga County
- New Market Township Community House, Hillsboro, listed on the NRHP in Highland County, Ohio
- William H. and Edgar Magness Community House and Library, McMinnville, Tennessee, listed on the NRHP in Warren County
- Community House, First Congregational Church, Eau Claire, Wisconsin
- Ripton Community House, Ripton, Vermont; NRHP-listed
- Barcroft Community House, Arlington, Virginia
