= Advent (disambiguation) =

Advent is a season in the Christian calendar preceding Christmas.

Advent may also refer to:

== Arts and entertainment ==
=== Computer games ===
- Colossal Cave Adventure or ADVENT, a 1970s computer game
- A faction in the game Sins of a Solar Empire
- ADVENT, the faction opposing the player in XCOM 2

=== Music ===
- The Advent, a British electronic music band
- Advent (band), an American hardcore punk band
- Advent, a five-person unit of Hololive
- "Advent", a song by Opeth from the album Morningrise

=== Other arts and entertainment ===
- Advent (film), a 2016 film by Roberto F. Canuto and Xu Xiaoxi
- Advent Trilogy, a series of fantasy novels by James Treadwell
- "Advent", a Series A episode of the television series QI (2003)

== Business ==
- Advent Computers, a computer brand produced by British company DSG International
- Advent Corporation, a former company founded by Henry Kloss that made speakers and home audio equipment
- Advent Film Group, a Christian film production and distribution company
- Advent International, a global buyout firm
- SS&C Advent, formerly named Advent Software, a financial software company based in San Francisco
- Advent (publisher), a publisher of science fiction books
- Advent (Voxx International), a brand of speakers, hi-fi equipment and computer peripherals

== Places ==
- Advent, Cornwall, United Kingdom, a civil parish
- Advent, West Virginia, United States, an unincorporated community
- Advent Historic District, Battle Creek, Michigan, United States, on the National Register of Historic Places

== Other uses ==
- USS Advent, a World War II minesweeper
- Adaptive Versatile Engine Technology, ADVENT, an aircraft engine development program run by the US Air Force
- Advent Bangun (1952–2018), Indonesian actor and martial arts artist
- The Advent (magazine), a magazine published by the Sri Aurobindo Ashram

== See also ==
- Advent City, an abandoned coal mining settlement on the island of Spitsbergen in Svalbard, Norway
- Adventism, a branch of Protestant Christianity
