= 23 Mile Road–Kalamazoo River Bridge =

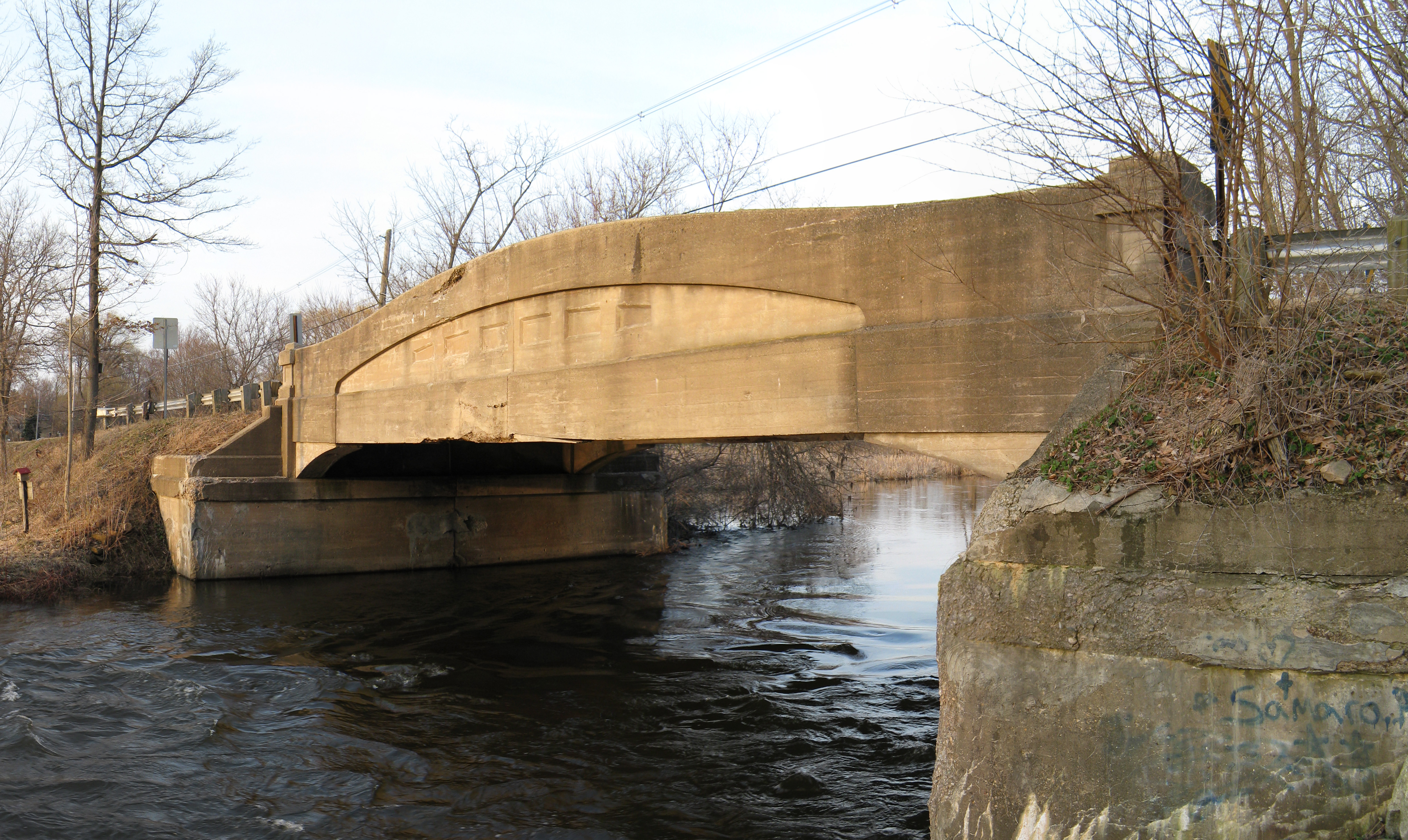
- Coordinates: 42.26827°N 84.84769°W

Characteristics
- Total length: 60 feet (18 m)
- Width: 25.6 feet (7.8 m)
- Longest span: 60 feet (18 m)
- No. of spans: 1

History
- Construction cost: $10,353
- 23 Mile Road–Kalamazoo River Bridge
- U.S. National Register of Historic Places
- Location within Michigan Location within the United States
- Built: 1922
- NRHP reference No.: 99001611
- Added to NRHP: December 22, 1999

Location
- Interactive map of 23 Mile Road–Kalamazoo River Bridge

The 23 Mile Road–Kalamazoo River Bridge is a curved-chord through-girder bridge in Marengo Township, Michigan, United States, that carries 23 Mile Road over the Kalamazoo River. Built in 1922, it is listed on the National Register of Historic Places.

== History ==
Prior to construction of the concrete structure, the river was spanned by another bridge at this location, presumably of a steel truss design. The new bridge was planned in January 1922 by the Michigan State Highway Department. Calhoun County subsequently built the structure as a State Reward Bridge. Mead Brothers of Battle Creek served as contractor in dismantling the previous span and building the new bridge. Construction cost $10,353.

The bridge was listed on the National Register of Historic Places on December 22, 1999. It was eligible as one of the oldest examples of its design and for its well-preserved state. The 12 Mile Road–Kalamazoo River Bridge, also in Calhoun County, was added the same day.

== Design ==
The bridge is oriented north–south and located about .25 miles (0.40 km) south of Marengo in a rural area. The bridge has a curved-chord through-girder design, a style developed by the Michigan State Highway Department in the early 1920s. The bridge consists of a single 60-foot-long (18 m) span. The girders, which also serve as railings, have a curved top surface and, along the sides, have elliptical recesses with six smaller recesses within. The corner posts have squared caps and bases to which are attached Armco guard rails. The northwest corner post bears a bridge plate.

== See also ==
- List of bridges on the National Register of Historic Places in Michigan
- National Register of Historic Places listings in Calhoun County, Michigan
