= Crossman-Withee Farm =

- U.S. National Register of Historic Places
- Crossman-Withee Farm, 1877

- Location within Michigan Location within the United States
- Interactive map
- Location: 21560 H Drive N, Marengo Township, Michigan
- Coordinates: 42.3048°N 85.8754°W
- Built: 1839
- Built by: Luther G. Crossman, Warren Withee
- Architectural style: Greek Revival
- NRHP reference No.: 100013433
- Added to NRHP: September 28, 2026

The Crossman-Withee Farm is a Sesquicentennial Farm built located at 21560 H Drive N in Marengo Township, Michigan. It was listed on the National Register of Historic Places in 2026.

== History ==
In 1833, Luther Crossman purchased the land on which this farm stands. Over the next few years, he cleared the land to begin farming. He married Amanda Burlingame in 1837, and by the end of 1838 he had he constructed and moved into a small house. In 1839, he built a cottage, which is now the first portion of the present farmhouse. Over the next decade, both Crossman's family and farmstead expanded. By 1850, he had constructed a haybarn, and by 1867 built a Greek Revival addition onto his home. Crossman's farm produced a diverse array of agricultural goods, including oats, potatoes, barley, hay, and apples, as well as wool, butter, and honey. Crossman constructed a horse barn in the late 1860s and an addition to the hay barn in 1875. Luther Crossman continued to farm the property until his death in 1879.

After Luther's death, his son George moved in to care for his mother, and began farming the land. Amanda Crossman died in 1899, and her daughter Eva and her husband John Withee purchased the farm. The Withees added outbuildings and continued to farm the land until Joh's death in 1913. In 1914, John and Eva's son Frank and his wife Laura began renting and farming the property. Eva Withee died in 1924, and Frank and Laura purchased the farm outright. They farmed the property, but lived in another house and rented out the farmhouse until 1934. The family continued to farm the land until about 1965, when they sold all remaining livestock. Frank Withee died in 1971 and Laura Withee followed in 1989, after which ownership of the property passed to their three sons. Grandchildren Laura and Robert purchased the property from the other heirs, and in 1999 Robert bought Laura's share. Since that time, Robert and Deborah Withee have owned and restored the family farm first built by Robert's great-great grandfather Luther Crossman.

== Description ==
The Crossman-Withee Farm consists of a Greek Revival farmhouse and several nearby outbuildings. The farmhouse is a T shape, made up of two parts. In the rear is a 1-1/2 story side-gabled cottage, constructed in 1839; a two-story side-gable structure, constructed in 1867, is in the front. The house is covered in clapboard and sits on a stone foundation. A one-story porch runs across the front of the symmetrical facade.

Outbuildings on the property include an 1850 hay barn with an 1870 addition, an 1860 horse barn, 1875 chicken coop, 1890 chicken coop, 1900 chicken coop, 1900 corn crib, and 1940 tractor barn.
