= 12 Mile Road–Kalamazoo River Bridge =

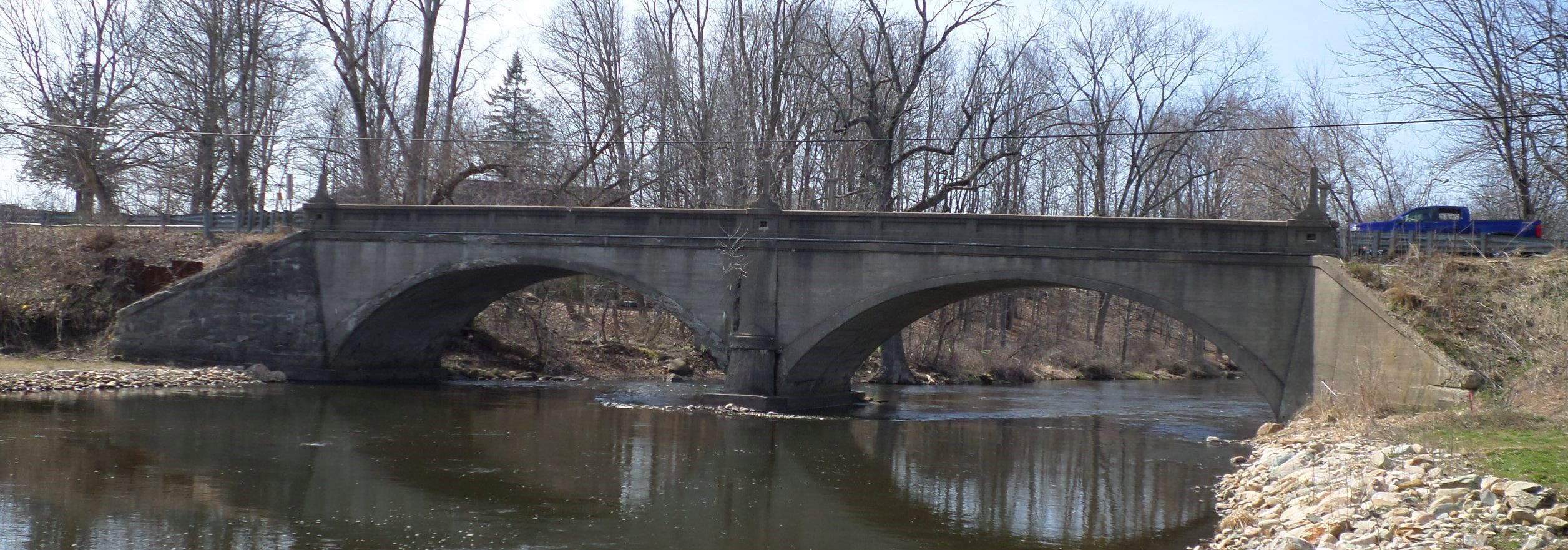
- The bridge in March 2016
- Coordinates: 42.2700°N 85.0615°W
- Crosses: Kalamazoo River
- Locale: Ceresco, Michigan

Characteristics
- Total length: 115 feet (35 m)
- Width: 24.5 feet (7.5 m)
- Longest span: 57.5 feet (17.5 m)
- No. of spans: 2

History
- Construction cost: $35,070

Statistics
- 12 Mile Road–Kalamazoo River Bridge
- U.S. National Register of Historic Places
- Built: 1920
- NRHP reference No.: 99001610
- Added to NRHP: December 22, 1999

Location
- Interactive map of 12 Mile Road–Kalamazoo River Bridge

The 12 Mile Road–Kalamazoo River Bridge, also known as State Reward Bridge No. 53, is a filled-spandrel concrete arch bridge in Ceresco, Michigan, that carries 12 Mile Road over the Kalamazoo River. Built in 1920, it is listed on the National Register of Historic Places.

== History ==
Plans for the bridge were developed by the Michigan State Highway Department from standard plans. The structure was built by Calhoun County in 1920 as State Reward Bridge No. 53. The contract was awarded to L. Smith, H.A. Nichols, and M.C. Nichols, of Hastings, Michigan, for their bid of $25,175 submitted on March 11, 1920. Construction cost $35,070, half of which was paid by the state of Michigan.

The bridge was listed on the National Register of Historic Places on December 22, 1999. It was eligible for its historical integrity and as a good example of the filled-spandrel design. The 23 Mile Road–Kalamazoo River Bridge, also in Calhoun County, was added the same day.

In July 2010, the Kalamazoo River oil spill affected the stretch of river that the bridge crosses.

== Design and location ==
The bridge is in the unincorporated village of Ceresco. A dam was previously located just upstream of the bridge, but was demolished in 2014 as part of the cleanup after the Enbridge oil spill. The two-span bridge is 115 feet (35 m) long and has a filled-spandrel concrete arch design. The arches are elliptical barrel vaults trimmed by a projecting string course. The bridge's parapet railings, built of solid concrete, each have ten recesses. At the corners and middle of the railings are concrete lampposts lacking fixtures. At the northwest and southeast corners are affixed bridge plates.

== See also ==
- List of bridges on the National Register of Historic Places in Michigan
- National Register of Historic Places listings in Calhoun County, Michigan
