= Sullivan Barn =

- Milk Producers Company Barn
- U.S. National Register of Historic Places
- Location within Michigan
- Interactive map
- Location: 47 S. Cass St., Battle Creek, Michigan
- Coordinates: 42°19′25″N 85°11′38″W
- Area: less than one acre
- Built: 1921
- Architect: Ernest W. Arnold
- Architectural style: Gambrel-roof Barn
- NRHP reference No.: 02000043
- Added to NRHP: February 14, 2002

The historic Sullivan Barn, also known as the Milk Producers Company Barn, is a repurposed barn located at 47 S. Cass Street in Battle Creek, Michigan. It was listed on the National Register of Historic Places in 2002.

== History ==
Frederick W. Sullivan was born in Erie, Pennsylvania in 1865 and grew up on his family's dairy farm. By the early 1900s, Sullivan was the manager of the Erie Milk Association, a milk-producing cooperative. In 1907, Sullivan purchased the Milk Producers Company (another dairy cooperative) in Battle Creek and moved to the city. The company had 17 employees and 8 milk routes at the time. Sullivan's dairy was significant in that it pasteurized its milk from 1907 onward, the first dairy in Battle Creek to do so. In 1912, the dairy moved to a location near the Kalamazoo River. In 1922, Sullivan commissioned local architect Ernest W. Arnold to design a barn to store the company's wagons and horses.

The Milk Producers Company pioneered the use of sanitized glass bottles and was among the first local dairies to offer homogenized milk and utilize the continuous method for producing ice cream. In 1935, Frederick's son Ralph took control of the company, and changed its name to the "Sullivan Milk Products Company." The business expanded after World War II and into the 1950s. Ralph Sullivan managed the company until 1960, and the family sold the business in 1969.

In 1984, the other buildings of Sullivan's Dairy were torn down, but the barn remained. It was taken over by the city of Battle Creek, and sold to developers in 1999. The barn was redeveloped into an office complex, which opened in 2003. In 2021, a child care facility was opened in two floors of the building.

== Description ==
The Sullivan Barn is a wood barn with a gambrel roof covered in shingles. The barn has three levels. The basement, or wagon floor, has a concrete floor and concrete columns. The second level is the horse floor, and originally had horse stalls along the length of the floor. This story also had a concrete floor. The third level was the hay floor, and is constructed of wood.
