= Record Printing and Box Company Building =

- U.S. National Register of Historic Places
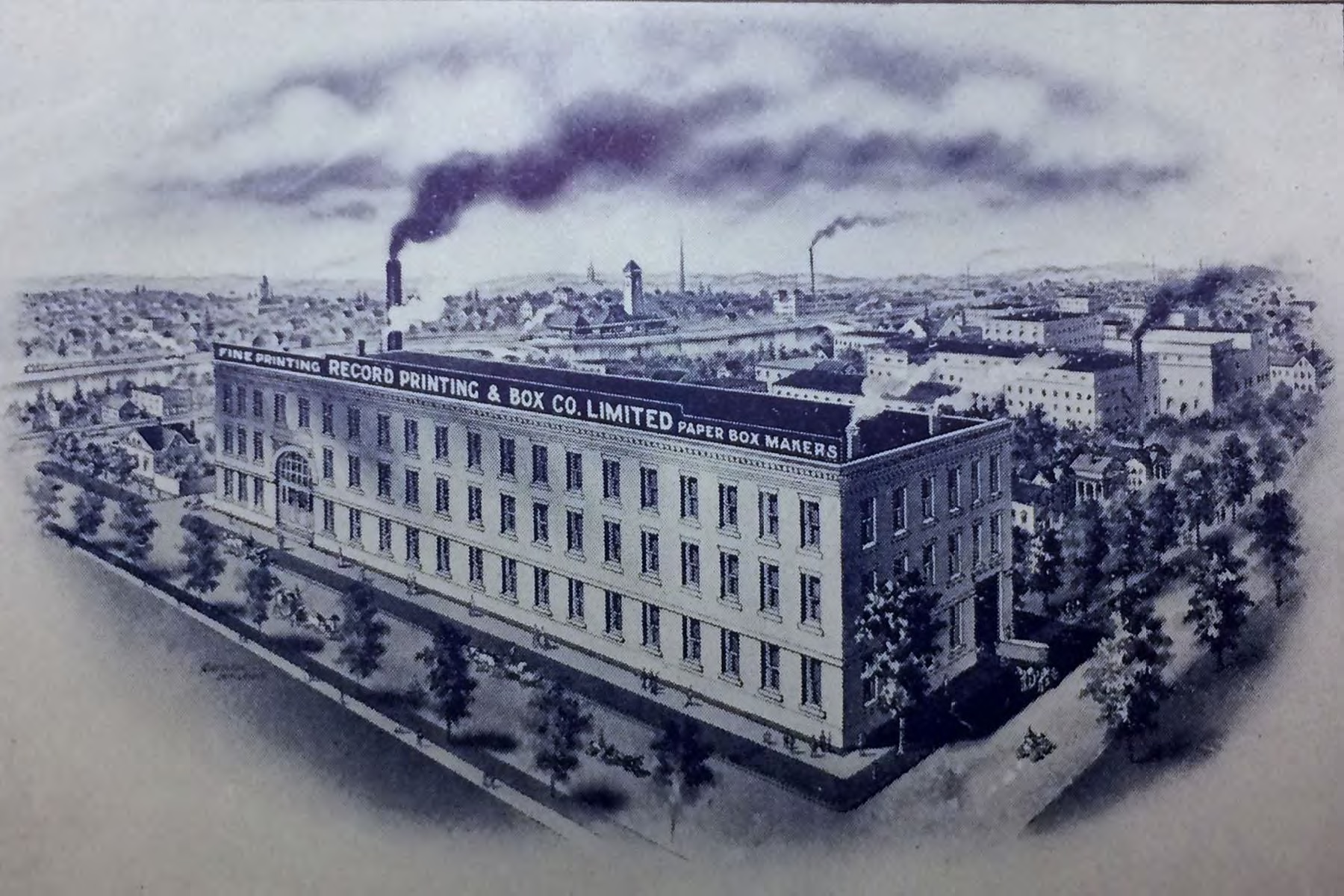

- Location within Michigan Location within the United States
- Interactive map
- Location: 15 Carlyle St. Battle Creek, Michigan
- Coordinates: 42°19′20″N 85°11′10″W
- Area: less than one acre
- Built: 1902
- Architectural style: Early 20th century commercial brick
- NRHP reference No.: 100004225
- Added to NRHP: July 22, 2019

The Record Printing and Box Company Building was built as a manufacturing and office building located at 15 Carlyle Street in Battle Creek, Michigan. It was listed on the National Register of Historic Places in 2019. As of 2019, the building was being redeveloped into mixed use commercial space.

== History ==
Battle Creek was a major center for printing in the late 19th century, with the Seventh-day Adventist Church publishing house located in the city, as well as smaller printing services. With the rise of the cereal industry in Battle Creek, including Kellogg's and Postum Cereal Company, several of the printers established lines to print cereal boxes. One of those was Eugene Cole, who in 1902 reorganized his newspaper publishing company as the Record Printing & Box Company. The company immediately constructed a new factory on Carlyle, and was soon employing 150 people and running presses 22 hours a day to keep up with demand. However, in 1905, Cole resigned due to ill health and the Record Printing and Box Company went into receivership. Although the business continued, in 1907 the plant boiler exploded, resulting in substantial damage. The Record Printing and Box Company was sold to board member W.I. Fell, who relocated the printing equipment to another building and reorganized the company into the Michigan Carton Company.

A portion of the now-vacant Carlyle plant was rented out to the W. H. Eldred's Wholesale Saddlery, a maker of fine leather goods. The business thrived, although the rise of the automobile slowly reduced demand for its products. Eldred temporarily retired in 1915, but reopened at the start of World War I to produce goods for the war. After the war, he shuttered the business permanently in 1919. In 1916, the Alsteel Manufacturing Company joined Elred as a tenant in the building, and in 1919 took over the entire structure. Alsteel manufactures a paper baler, meant to compress flammable waste materials and reduce fire risk. The company expanded to produce a range of steel products, including wire baskets, lawn-sprinklers, vegetable slicers, and hose clamps. Alsteel remained in the facility until 1952, when they moved to a larger building.

Afterward, the Record Printing and Box Company Building was used as a warehouse and sales office for Hermann Typewriter Service. In 1968, the company was purchased by Fred Crandal and renamed Officeways. Crandal retired in 2000 and donated the building to the Battle Creek Community Foundation. The now-vacant building was sold to the City of Battle Creek in 2003. Redevelopment was planned, but did not come to fruition until 2017, when the building was purchased by Restore (269), a local development company. As of 2019, the company was redeveloping the building as a mixed-use space, housing a brewery and taproom on the first floor, a technology office and shared work space on the second floor, and an event space on the third floor.

== Description ==
The Record Printing and Box Company Building is a three-story brick timber-framed building with a flat roof, typical of manufacturing plants built at the turn of the century. The external brick is brown. Window openings are arched or flat with keystones. The main entrance is through a double door located in an arched brick opening with semicircle glass window above Brick cornices run atop the building along the street facades.
