= Frank and Dorothy Ward House =

Residence in Battle Creek, Michigan

- Formerly listed on the U.S. National Register of Historic Places
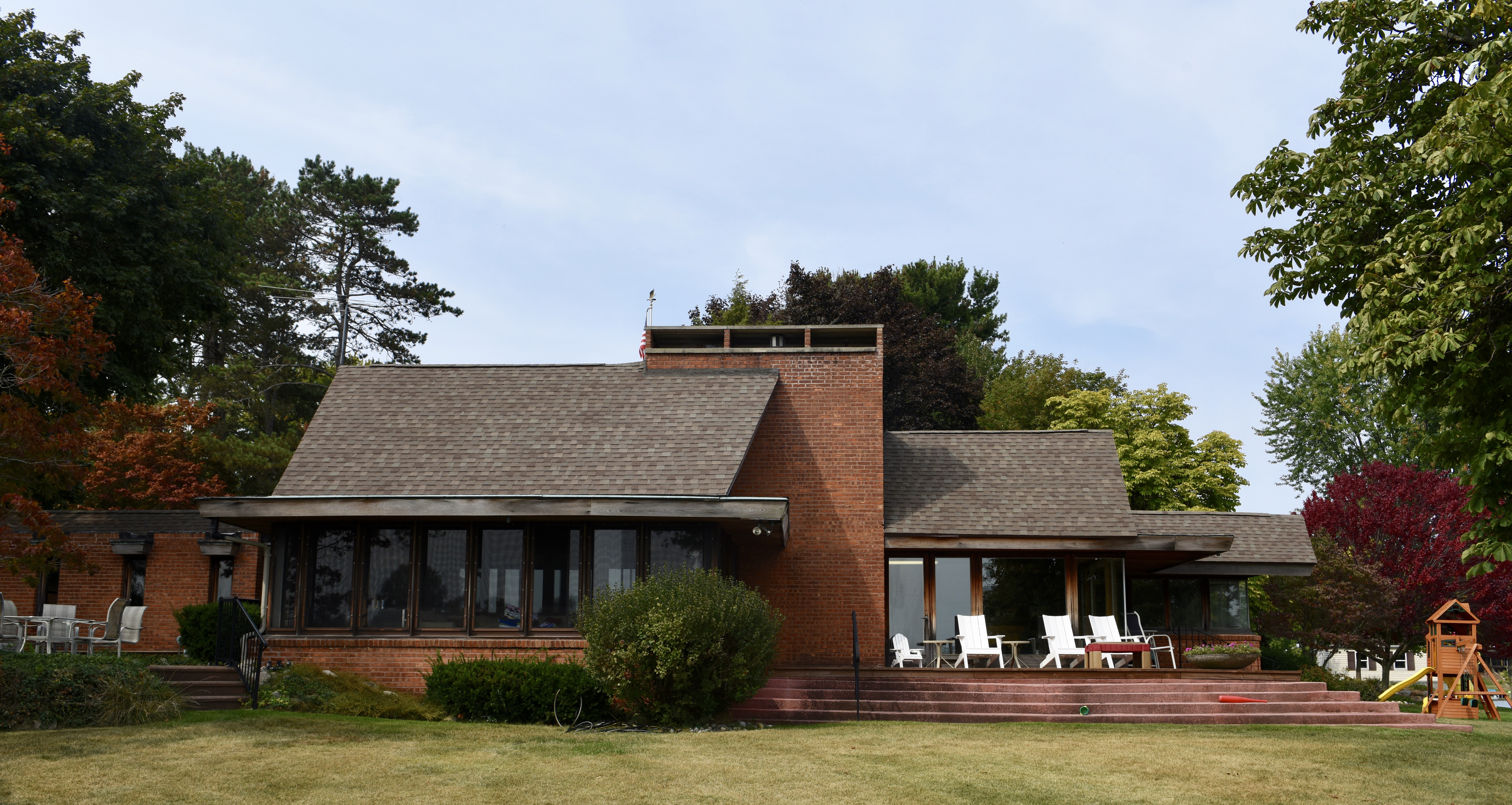
- Interactive map
- Location: 257 Lakeshore Dr., Battle Creek, Michigan
- Coordinates: 42°17′14″N 85°13′07″W
- Area: less than one acre
- Built: 1951
- Architect: Yuzuru Kawahara
- Architectural style: Wrightian
- Demolished: 2017
- NRHP reference No.: 14000562

Significant dates
- Added to NRHP: September 10, 2014
- Removed from NRHP: April 27, 2026

The Frank and Dorothy Ward House was a single-family residence designed by architect Yuzuru Kawahara and previously located at 257 Lakeshore Drive in Battle Creek, Michigan. It was listed on the National Register of Historic Places in 2014. Unfortunately, despite its National Register status, the house was demolished in 2017 and removed from the National Register in 2026..

== History ==
Frank Ward was born in 1912. When he turned 16, he enrolled at the Northwestern Military and Naval Academy in Lake Geneva, Wisconsin. He graduated in 1932, and was commissioned in the US Army. He served in World War II, eventually rising to the rank of colonel. As part of his duties, he was sent to Hiroshima and Nagasaki to research which structures in those cities had been strong enough to withstand the atomic blasts detonated at the end of the war. After leaving the military, Ward became the Civil Defense Director for Michigan and, in 1957, he became the Civil Defense Director for Battle Creek.

In 1951, Ward purchased two lots in Battle Creek and began searching for an architect to design a house. He hired Yuzuru Kawahara, who had studied with Frank Lloyd Wright at Taliesin from 1944 through 1948. Kawahara had assisted other Taliesin graduates with designs, and later went on to become a prolific designer of commercial structures in San Jose, California. The Ward residence was his first and only solo residential commission. Kawahara designed a Wrightian house that faced the lakefront, and incorporated a fallout shelter in the basement, requested by Ward based on his wartime experiences. The house was built over the timeframe of a year, and finished in 1952. The Ward House remained in the ownership of the Ward family until 2013, after which it was sold. The house was later demolished to build a new house in its place.

== Description ==
The Ward House was located on a triangular lakefront lot with much wider lake frontage than road frontage. The design of the house incorporated extensive lake views. The house was a one-story, L-shaped dwelling with an intersecting, unevenly pitched gable rooflines and wide, overhanging eaves. The walls were made of red brick and cypress planks, and the house sat on a concrete block foundation. An attached garage was located on one side of the structure. The main entrance to the house was located in the corner formed by the intersecting L.

On the interior, the floor plan contained a central living and dining room area from which two perpendicular wings extended. One wing contained a continuous side hallway, off which were located three bedrooms, two bathrooms and an office. The other wing contained the kitchen and garage. The kitchen also contained a stairwell to the basement. The basement contained multiple rooms, including an elaborate fallout shelter, separate from the foundations of the house.
