= Kellogg-Warden House =

- U.S. National Register of Historic Places
- Michigan State Historic Site
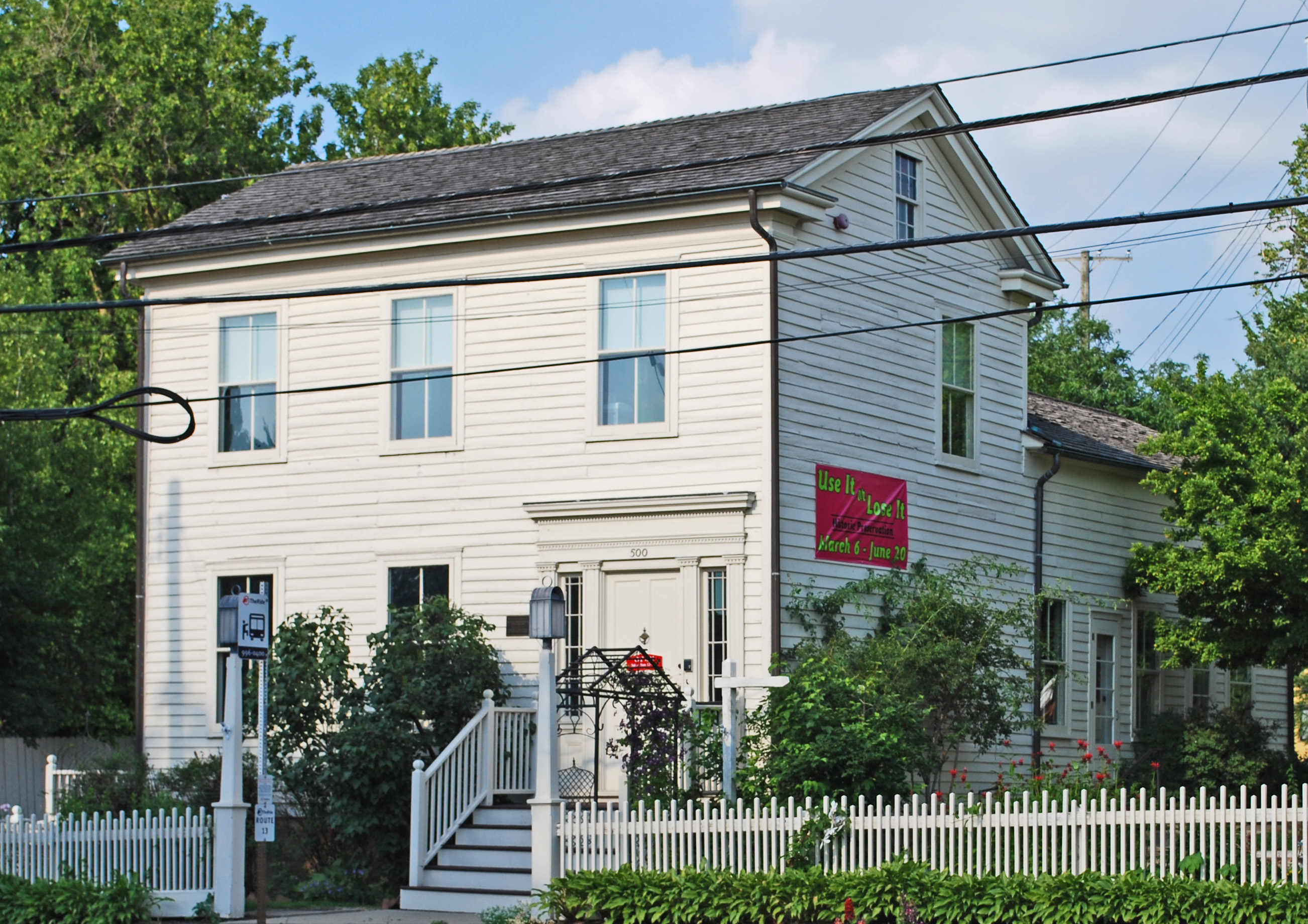

- Location within Michigan Location within the United States
- Interactive map showing Kellogg-Warden House
- Location: 500 N. Main St., Ann Arbor, Michigan
- Coordinates: 42°17′06″N 83°44′53″W
- Area: less than one acre
- Built: c. 1835
- Architectural style: Greek Revival
- NRHP reference No.: 94000754
- Added to NRHP: July 22, 1994

The Kellogg-Warden House is a single-family house located at 500 North Main Street in Ann Arbor, Michigan. It was listed on the National Register of Historic Places in 1994. It now houses the Washtenaw County Historical Society's Museum on Main Street.

== History ==
This house was originally located at what is now 1015 Wall Street. Although the date of construction cannot be verified, tax and sales records suggest that the original section of the house was built about 1835. In 1837, Dan W. Kellogg purchased five contiguous lots, including the one this house sat on. In 1838, Kellogg sold them to his brother-in-law Ethan A. Warden. In 1839, Warden sold two of the lots, including the one containing this house, ho his father-in-law (and Dan Kellogg's father) Charles Kellogg, who move the Ann Arbor about this time. The sales prices suggest that the main portion of the house was constructed by Warden before his father-in-law's arrival.

Charles Kellogg lived in the house until his death in 1842, and his wife Mary Ann Otis Kellogg lived there until her death two years later. The Kellogg heirs sold the house in 1853 to Samuel Ruthruff, who lived in it until the early 1890s when German immigrant gardener Charles Greiner and his wife Kate purchased it. The Greiners later sold it to Laura Bauer Marz (a relative of Kate Greiner) and her husband John. Laura Marz lived in the house until her death in 1988, when it was sold to the University of Michigan.

The university planned to use the land for a parking lot, but recognizing the historical significance, gave the house to the Washtenaw County Historical Society. In 1990, the house was moved to its current location on North Main. The Washtenaw County Historical Society refurbished the house and it now houses the Museum on Main Street.

== Description ==
The Kellogg-Warden House is a side-gable, side hall, Greek Revival half-I-house with a one-and-one-half-story gable-roof rear addition. It measures approximately twenty-six feet by forty-six feet. The house is sided with clapboard, and currently sits on a concrete block foundation, which has been faced with the fieldstones and bricks form the original foundation. The house has a box cornice with returns in the gable ends. The main facade is three bays wide, with the front door at one end. The door is flanked by four fluted pilasters. The windows are primarily double-hung sash units with two-over-two lights, save for a six-over-six window in the attic.
