= The Kellogg House =

Historic house in New York, United States

- U.S. National Register of Historic Places
- Location within New York Location within the United States
- Location: Old Pleasant Hill Rd., Cornwall, New York
- Coordinates: 41°25′31″N 74°3′57″W
- Area: 1.5 acres (0.61 ha)
- Built: ca. 1795; 231 years ago
- Architectural style: Federal
- MPS: Cornwall MPS
- NRHP reference No.: 00001414
- Added to NRHP: April 16, 2001

The Kellogg House is a historic home located at Cornwall in Orange County, New York. It was built about 1795 and is a 2 1/2-story, five-bay, center-hall-plan wood-frame dwelling. It features an overhanging gable roof with exposed rafters.

It was listed on the National Register of Historic Places in 2001.
