= Adam C. Arnold Block =

Building in Battle Creek, Michigan, U.S.

- U.S. National Register of Historic Places
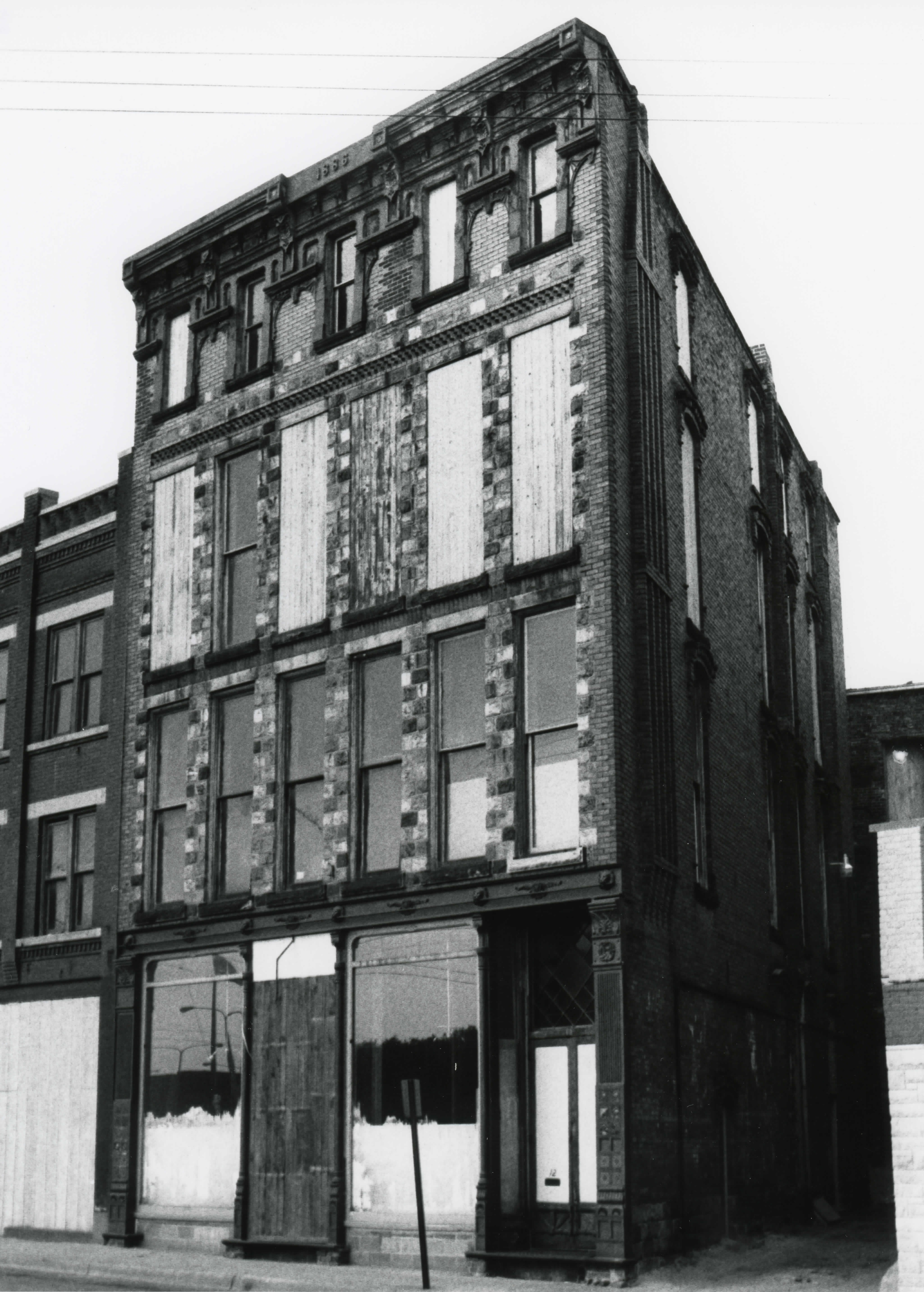
- Adam C Arnold Block, 1982
- Interactive map
- Location: 12-14 E. State St., Battle Creek, Michigan
- Coordinates: 42°19′09″N 85°10′54″W
- Area: less than one acre
- Built: 1886
- Architectural style: Late Victorian
- Demolished: September, 1988
- NRHP reference No.: 83000839
- Added to NRHP: March 24, 1983

The Adam C. Arnold Block was a commercial building located at 12-14 East State Street in Battle Creek, Michigan. It was listed on the National Register of Historic Places in 1983. It was demolished in 1988.

== History ==
Adam C. Arnold arrived in Battle Creek in 1857 with his wife, Marla Dygert Arnold. He first ran a wooden pump-manufacturing business, gaining the nickname "Pump." After some time, he found that operating a hotel and saloon was more lucrative, and he ran the Arnold House (later renamed the Exchange Hotel). The hotel and saloon quickly acquired an unsavory reputation, as Arnold repeatedly violated the city's liquor control laws and allegedly bilked travelers out of their change. However, business was good, and in 1886 Arnold constructed the Arnold Block. The block originally contained a restaurant and saloon operated by Arnold's son George H. Arnold, in addition to A. C. Arnold's office and storage for pawned goods. Just as the Arnold House/Exchange Hotel had quickly acquired an unsavory reputation, the Arnold Block did likewise, with rumors of prostitutes and other shady characters.

In 1895, George H. Arnold was found murdered, and Adam C. Arnold was eventually convicted of the crime. He appealed, and while released, died himself in 1897. By this time, much of Arnold's assets had been lost to legal fees, and the Arnold Block was in the possession of the City Bank of Battle Creek. In 1896, the "Arnold Mission" for men hunting work was established in the Arnold Block, with the bank donating free rent. Eventually the mission hosted a cheap lunch counter, free beds, and free baths. In subsequent years, the building housed a telephone company warehouse, a restaurant, a furniture store, billiard roan, barber shop, real estate office, cigar store, and office supply store warehouse. In the early 1980s, the building was refurbished to house an antique store, "Pump Arnold's Place." In 1988, the building was demolished to make way for the headquarters of the W. K. Kellogg Foundation.

== Description ==
The Adam C. Arnold Block was a four-story Late Victorian red brick commercial block with a flat roof. It measured thirty feet wide and fifty-one feet deep on one side, and sixty-five deep on the other. The building had a facade with extensive ornamentation, including an iron cornice and iron storefront elements, stone window surrounds, and decorative tile. On the first floor, the storefront held a plate glass windows framed by galvanized iron architectural piers and lintels . To one side was a recessed entrance to the staircase leading to the upper floors. The store entrance was through wooden double doors with transom lights above. The second and third floors contained rock-faced window facings, lintels, and sills, above which were bands of sawtooth brickwork extending across the facade. On the fourth floor, more galvanized Iron trim surrounded the windows, as well as "bat-wing" and keystone trim between the windows. Above were the cornice with supporting brackets and frieze, also of galvanized iron.
