= Community House (Winnetka, Illinois) =

- U.S. National Register of Historic Places
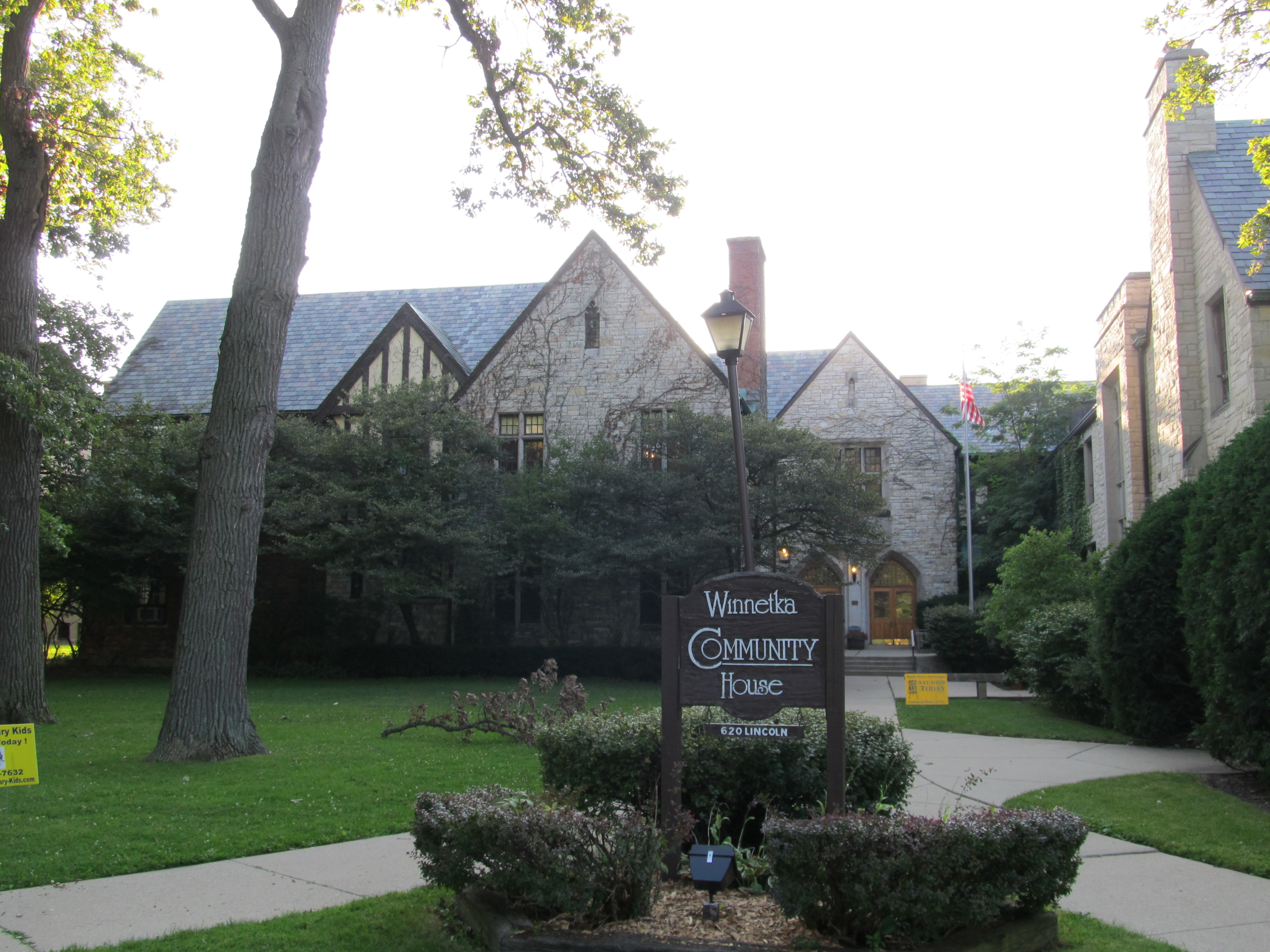

- Location within Illinois Location within the United States
- Location: 620 Lincoln Ave., Winnetka, Illinois
- Coordinates: 42°6′29″N 87°44′0″W
- Area: 3 acres (1.2 ha)
- Built: 1911
- Architect: Coffin, Arthur; Hamilton, Fellows and Nedved
- Architectural style: Tudor Revival, Colonial Revival
- NRHP reference No.: 07000854
- Added to NRHP: August 30, 2007

The Community House, also known as the Winnetka Community House, is a 3-acre (1.2 ha) community center located at 620 Lincoln Avenue in Winnetka, Illinois. The center was completed in 1911, though it has been expanded several times since. Architect Arthur Coffin designed the building primarily in the Tudor Revival style, though his design also incorporated elements of the Prairie School. The building hosted a wide variety of community activities for all ages and genders, including sports and gym classes in its gymnasium, music and photography groups, billiards, and lectures; by the end of 1911, 51 different groups had begun meeting in the center. While the Community House was nonsectarian, its establishment and operation were heavily influenced by Winnetka's Congregational Church and inspired by its principles of community, education, and youth outreach. In keeping with the popular contemporary settlement movement, the church also planned the center as a settlement house; while it lacked living spaces, it included other typical settlement houses features such as its gymnasium, dining areas, and meeting rooms.

The community center was listed on the National Register of Historic Places on August 30, 2007.
