= Superior Street Commercial Historic District =

- U.S. National Register of Historic Places
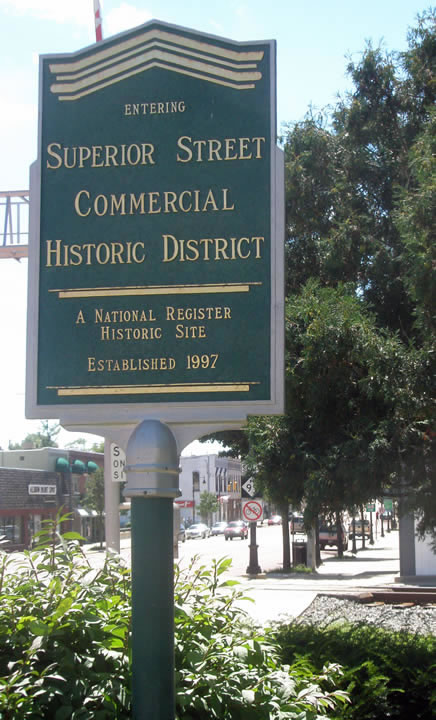
- HD designation, north end of district
- Interactive map
- Location: Roughly bounded by the Kalamazoo River, Cass, Elm, Eaton and Vine Sts., Albion, Michigan
- Coordinates: 42°14′40″N 84°45′13″W
- Area: 35 acres (14 ha)
- Built: 1845
- Architect: Rockwell A. Leroy, Dean, Meritt & Cole
- Architectural style: Classical Revival, Second Empire, Italianate
- NRHP reference No.: 97000626
- Added to NRHP: August 18, 1997

The Superior Street Commercial Historic District is a commercial historic district, running primarily along Superior Street from Elm Street to Vine Street in Albion, Michigan. It was listed on the National Register of Historic Places in 1997.

== History ==
Albion was first platted in 1836, and by the following year there were two mills operating along the river and a tiny settlement. In 1844, a railroad line was constructed through the north side of Albion, and later commercial development gravitated to that section of the village. The railroad access brought new settlers who farmed the surrounding area, and mills and elevators became an important part of Albion's economy. Fourdries and other manufacturing interests were also established in the mid-1800s. Through the rest of the century, Albion grew steadily, and the commercial district kept pace. The earliest extant buildings in the district are Italianate commercial structures dating from the 1850s. Similar style commercial buildings were constructed into the 1880s, and make up a substantial portion of the district. Around the commercial heart of Albion, other buildings were constructed for government and social use: churches, an opera house, library, city hall and social clubs. As additional structures were built into the twentieth century, the commercial architecture began to change into a more simplified post-Victorian style.

== Description ==
The Superior Street Commercial Historic District contains 92 structures, of which 75 contribute to the historic character of the district. The buildings are primarily located on Superior Street, but the district does include some blocks to either side. The Superior streetscape is visually unified by the relatively uniform building heights and the similar decorative window hood moldings on the buildings. Buildings within the district range roughly from the mid 1850s to the 1950s, and are primarily of two- and three-story brick commercial buildings. Many of these are of Italianate design, but there are several buildings constructed in Prairie, Second Empire, and Romanesque styles.

== Gallery ==
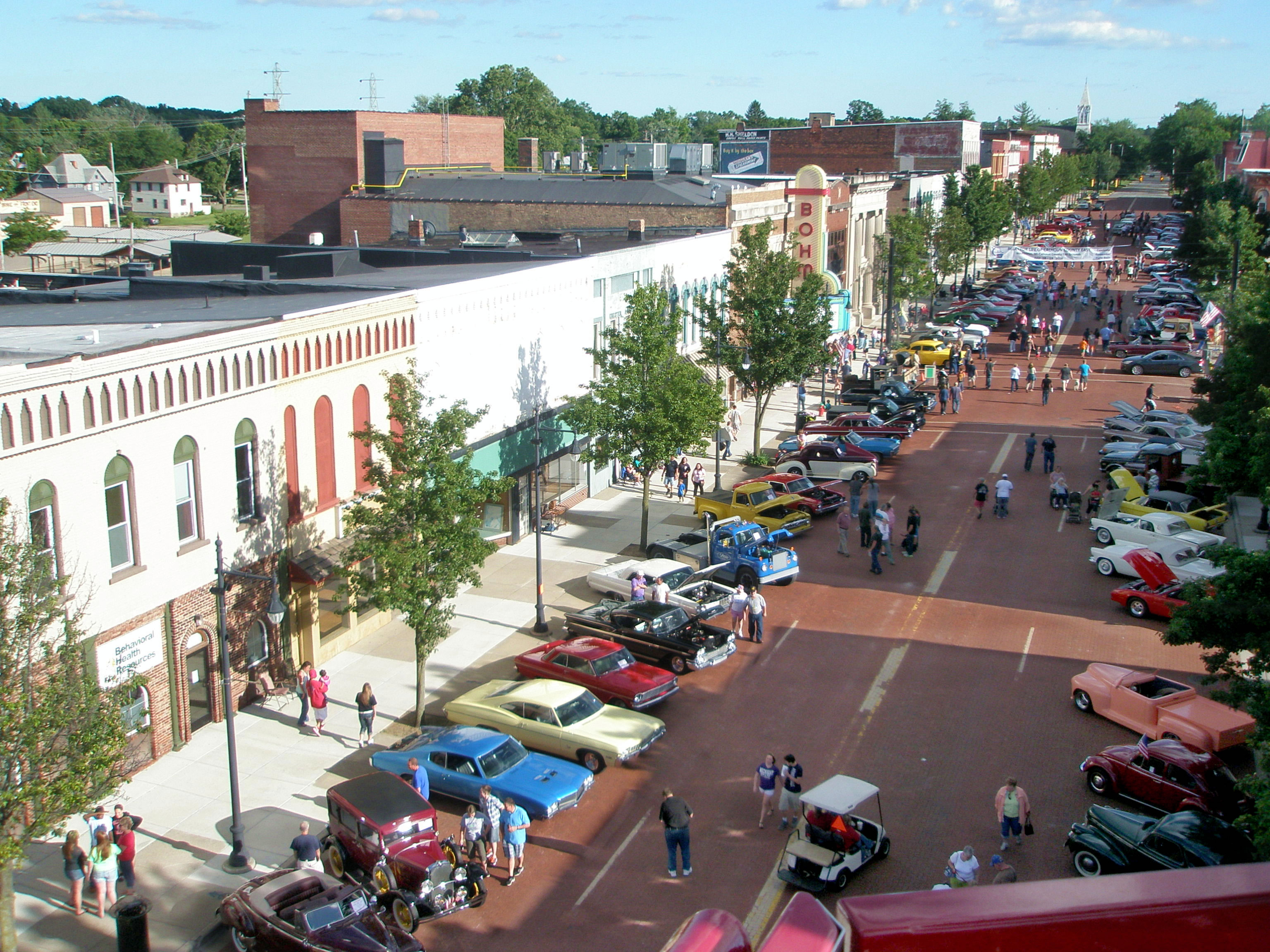
Superior Street near Center, looking south

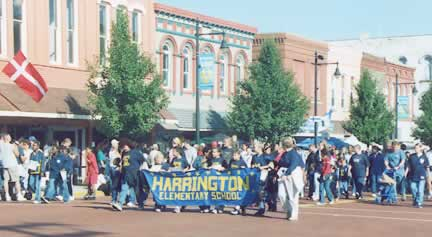
Parade

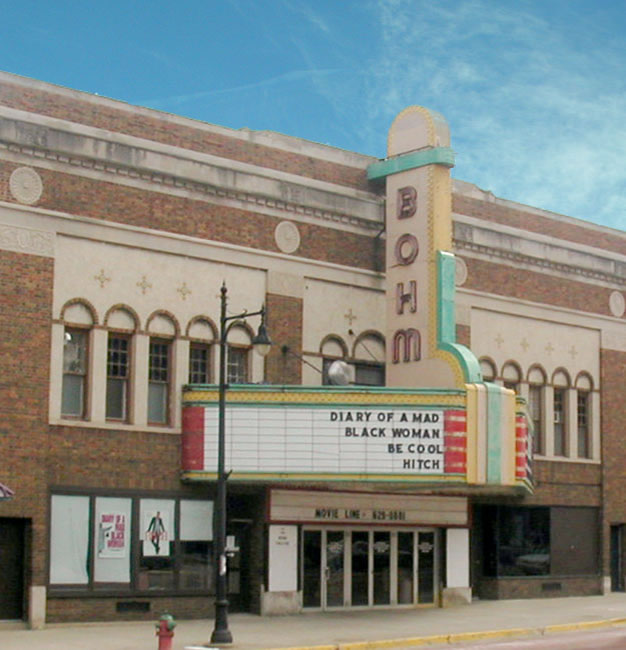
Bohm Theatre

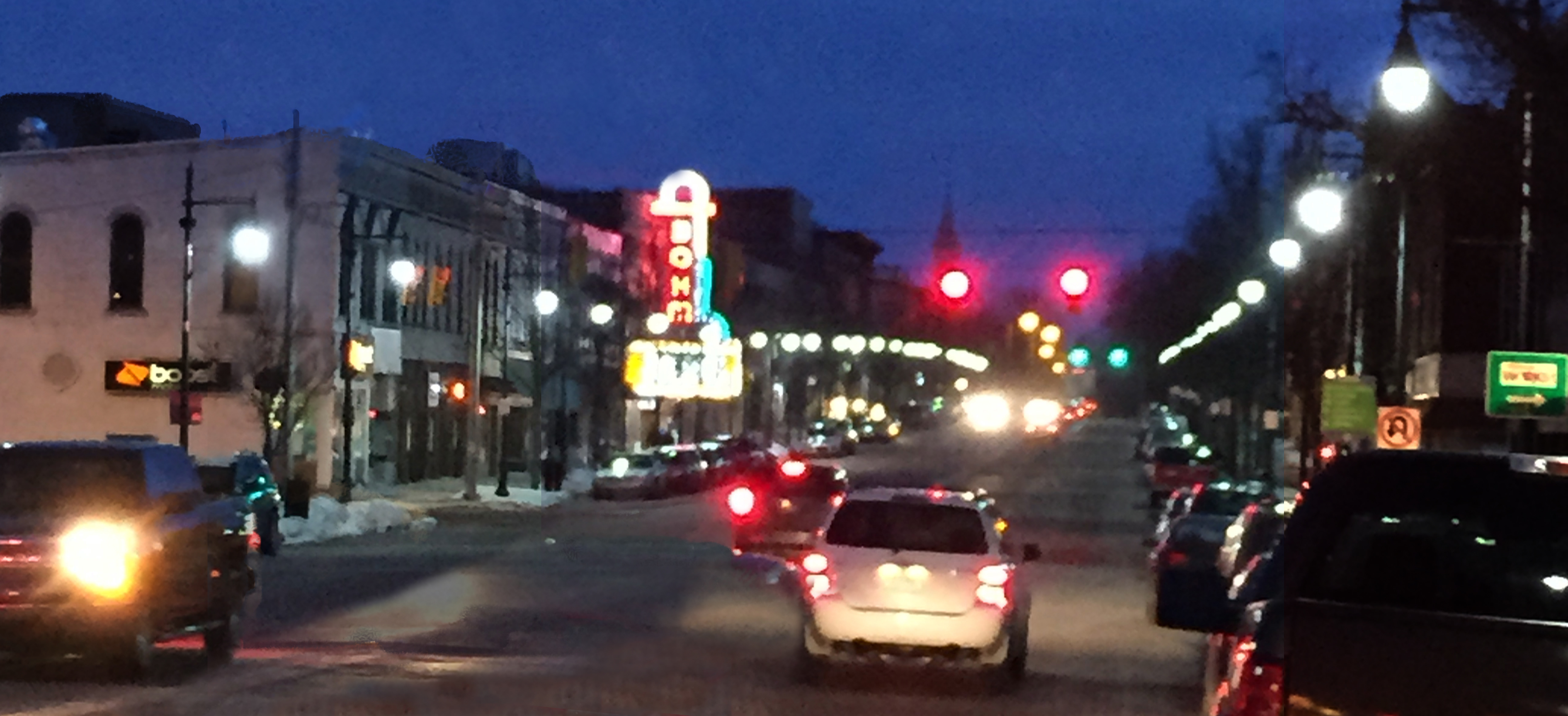
Night scene

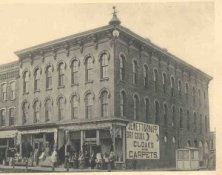
Superior and Center, historic photo
