= Merritt Woods Historic District =

- U.S. National Register of Historic Places
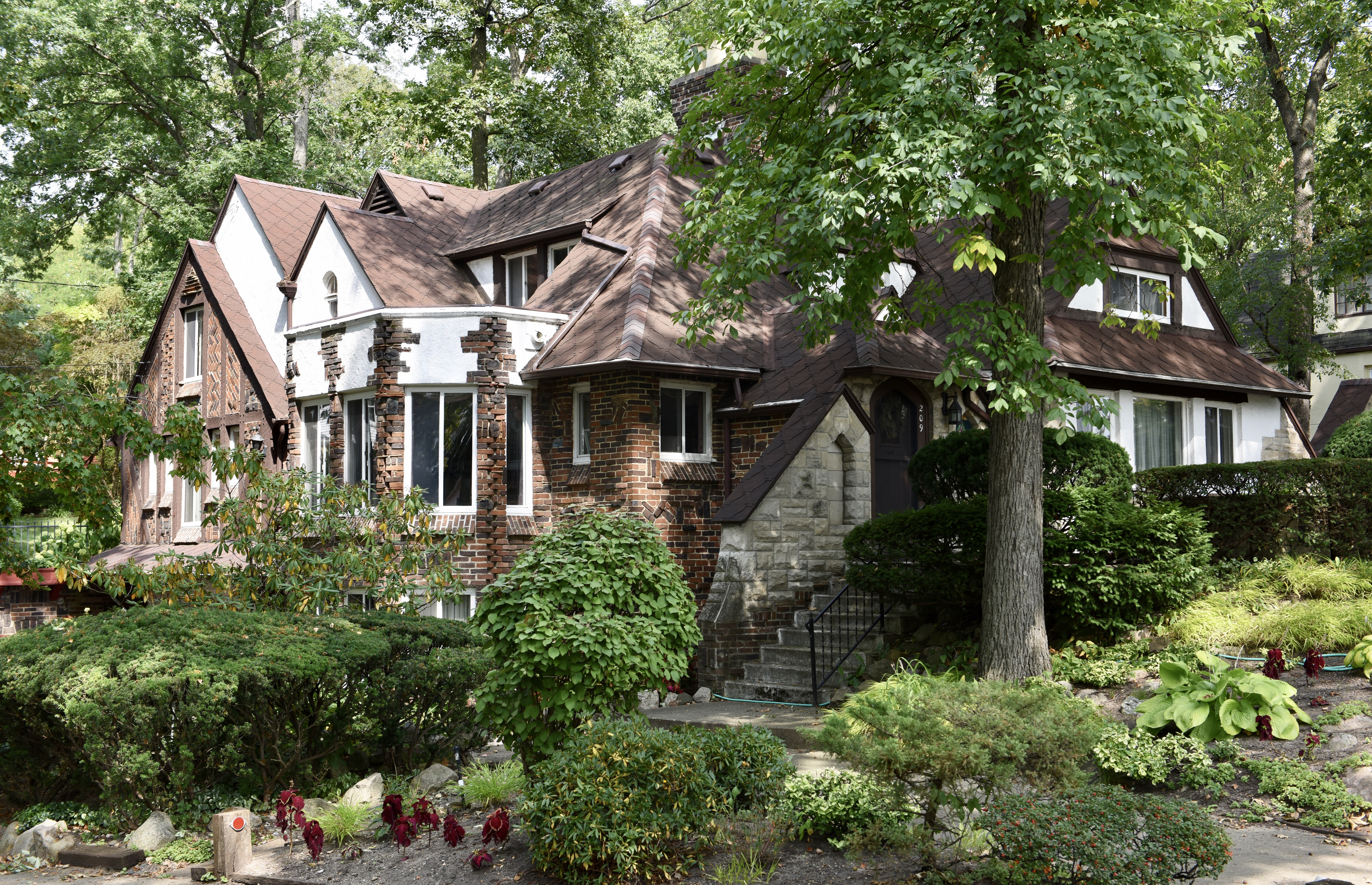
- 209 Emmett St E.
- Interactive map
- Location: Roughly bounded by Orchard, Emmett and Chestnut Sts. and northernmost parts of Woodmer Dr. and Crest Dr., Battle Creek, Michigan
- Coordinates: 42°19′51″N 85°10′19″W
- Area: 13 acres (5.3 ha)
- Architect: Adelbert B. Chanel, Edward X. Tuttle
- Architectural style: Colonial Revival, Tudor Revival
- NRHP reference No.: 94000622
- Added to NRHP: June 17, 1994

The Merritt Woods Historic District is a residential historic district, roughly bounded by Orchard Street, Emmett Street, Chestnut Street, and the northernmost parts of Woodmer Drive and Crest Drive in Battle Creek, Michigan. It was listed on the National Register of Historic Places in 1994.

== History ==
In 1921, a group of prominent Battle Creek residents began developing a 23-acre tract purchased from Mrs. E.M.C. Merritt. The two original promoters of this exclusive residential area were Attorney Verner W. Main and Architect A.B. Chanel. Chanel, went on to design nine of the houses built in the neighborhood. One of these homes, 9 Woodmer lane, was his own residence, built in 1927. They platted the area into spacious lots, with boundaries following the local topography. Grading of the area was done in 1923, and by 1927 the first two houses had been constructed in the new subdivision. Two more were added in 1928, but the onset of the Great Depression slowed growth, and it was not until 1931 that the next four homes were built. Eight more were built in the 1930s, but the onset of World War II again halted expansion until 1948, when three more houses were built. One more house was built in the 1950s, and the last two were added in the 1960s.

Merritt Woods was developed in an era when the city planning movement was being institutionalized, and the conservation movement in Michigan was just beginning to gather momentum. The respect for the existing features, the careful crafting of deed restrictions, and the establishment of a governing body to enforce and maintain the quality of the development reflected an internalization of the tenets of these movements.

== Description ==
The Merritt Woods Historic District contains 23 residences, of which 18 contribute to the historic nature of the neighborhood. The houses are located on unusually large lots, with irregular lot lines. The district contains mature oak, hickory, and slippery elm trees. Streets are gently curving, following the terrain. Houses are sited 30 or more feet from the streets. Most of the houses in the district are two-story Colonial Revival and Tudor Revival styles, constructed of brick or stone construction. Some have upper levels clad with stucco, stucco with half timber, clapboard or shakes. All are single family homes containing attached garages.
