= Van Buren Street Historic District =

- U.S. National Register of Historic Places
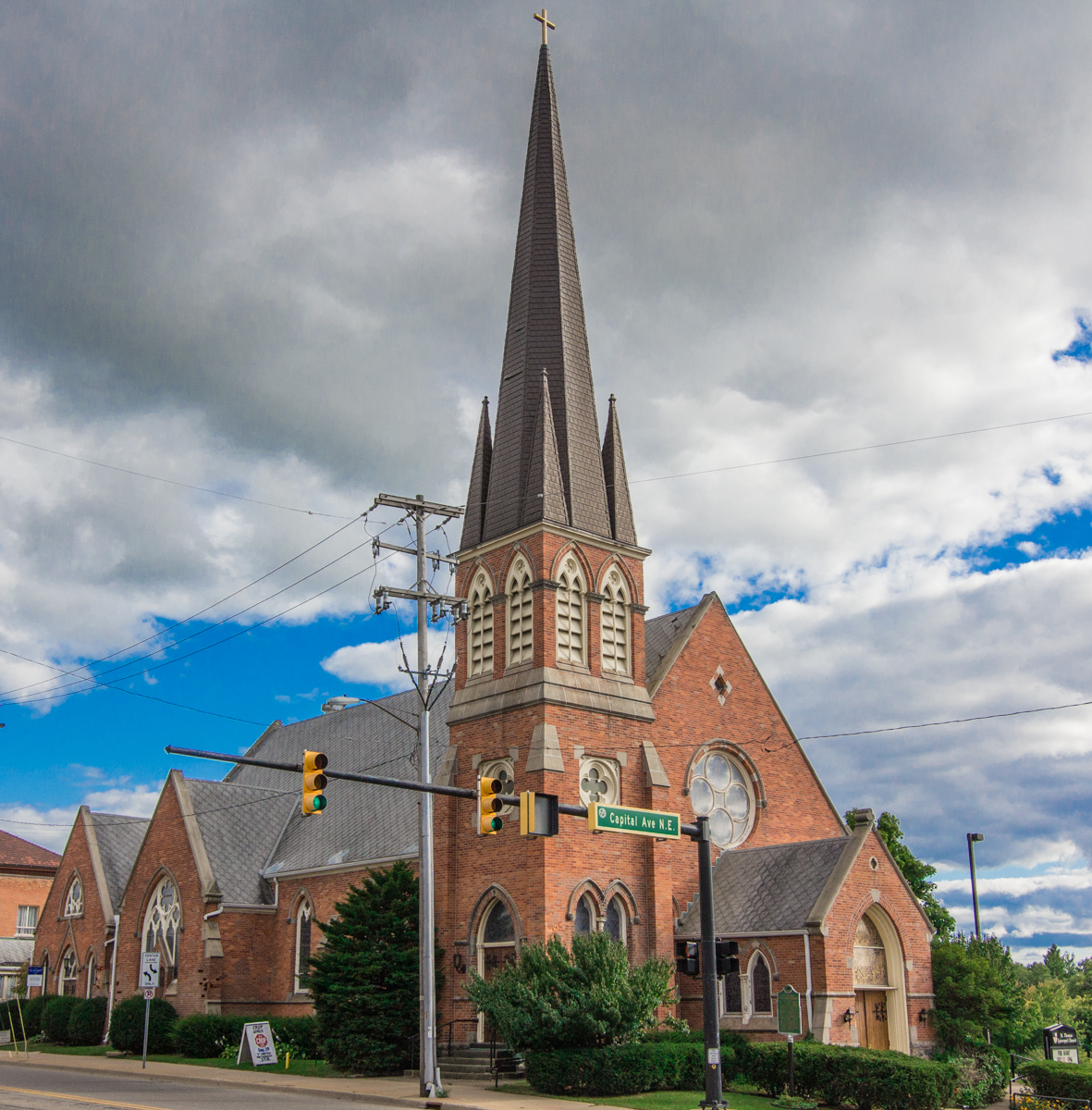
- St. Thomas Episcopal Church
- Interactive map
- Location: Roughly, Van Buren St. from Capital and Cherry Sts. to Calhoun St. and North Ave., Battle Creek, Michigan
- Coordinates: 42°19′22″N 85°10′51″W
- Area: 25 acres (10 ha)
- Architect: Mortimer L. Smith, et al
- Architectural style: Classical Revival, Art Deco, Late Gothic Revival
- NRHP reference No.: 96000367
- Added to NRHP: April 4, 1996

The Van Buren Street Historic District is a cultural historic district located roughly along Van Buren Street from Capital and Cherry Streets to Calhoun Street and North Avenue in Battle Creek, Michigan. It was listed on the National Register of Historic Places in 1996.

== History ==
In the late 19th century, this section of Battle Creek lay between the commercial center of the city and the most prestigious residential neighborhoods. As such, what is now the Van Buren Street Historic District became the location of some of the city's oldest cultural institutions. This began in 1847 and 1858, when the first high school and St. Thomas Episcopal church were constructed in the district, on sites that now house current buildings for the same organizations. The 1870s brought the construction of successor buildings for both the high school and Episcopalian church, as well as a new St. Philip Catholic Church. In the 1880s the Michigan Central Railroad constructed a new depot. By the 1930s, the district was home to four churches, a public junior high and a Catholic school, and the local YMCA.

== Description ==
The Van Buren Street Historic District contains 22 buildings and structures, of which 19 contribute to the historic character of the neighborhood. Most of the buildings are large public and cultural structures, including churches, schools, and a railroad depot; three houses are also included. The structures are mostly located within a block of the intersection of Van Buren Street and Capital Streets.

Buildings in the district include:

- Williard Memorial Library (7 W. Van Buren)
- St. Thomas Episcopal Church (66 Capital NE)
- YMCA Building (77 Capital NE)
- St Philip Catholic Church complex (92 Capital NE): This includes seven buildings: the main church, a rectory, the Grotto of Our Lady of Lourdes, an elementary school, high school, convent, fine arts building, and the American Marsh Pumps Pattern Building, purchased by the church in the 1960s.
- Farley Funeral Home (105 Capital NE)
- First Presbyterian Church (115 Capital NE)
- Shaw Funeral Home (121 Capital NE)
- David Cady House (130 Capital NE)
- First Congregation Church (145 Capital NE)
- Michigan Central Railroad Station (44 N. McCamly)
- Ward Memorial Fountain (near the station)
- W.K. Kellogg Memorial Junior High (60 W. Van Buren)
- Battle Creek Central High School (100 W. Van Buren)

== Gallery ==
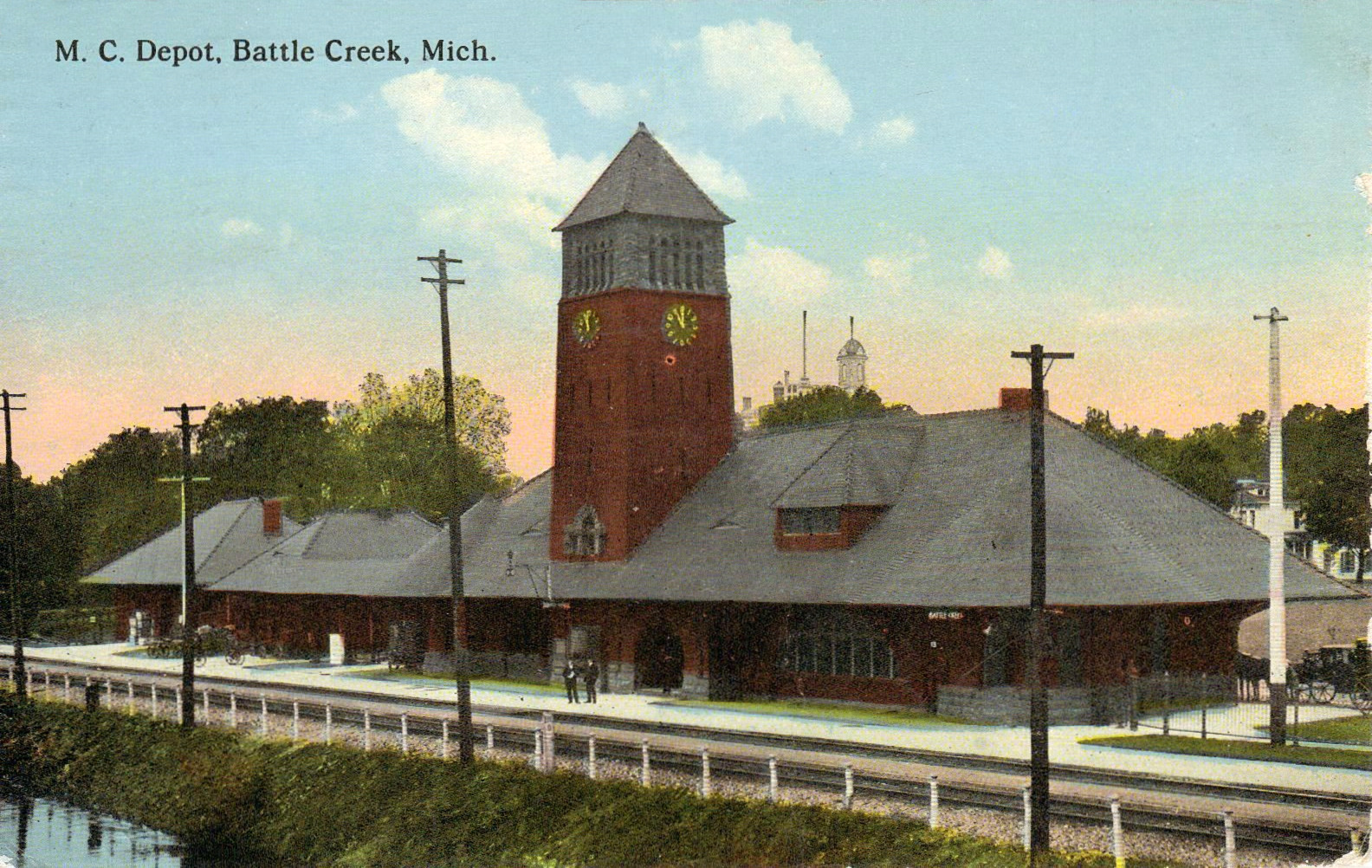
Michigan Central Depot

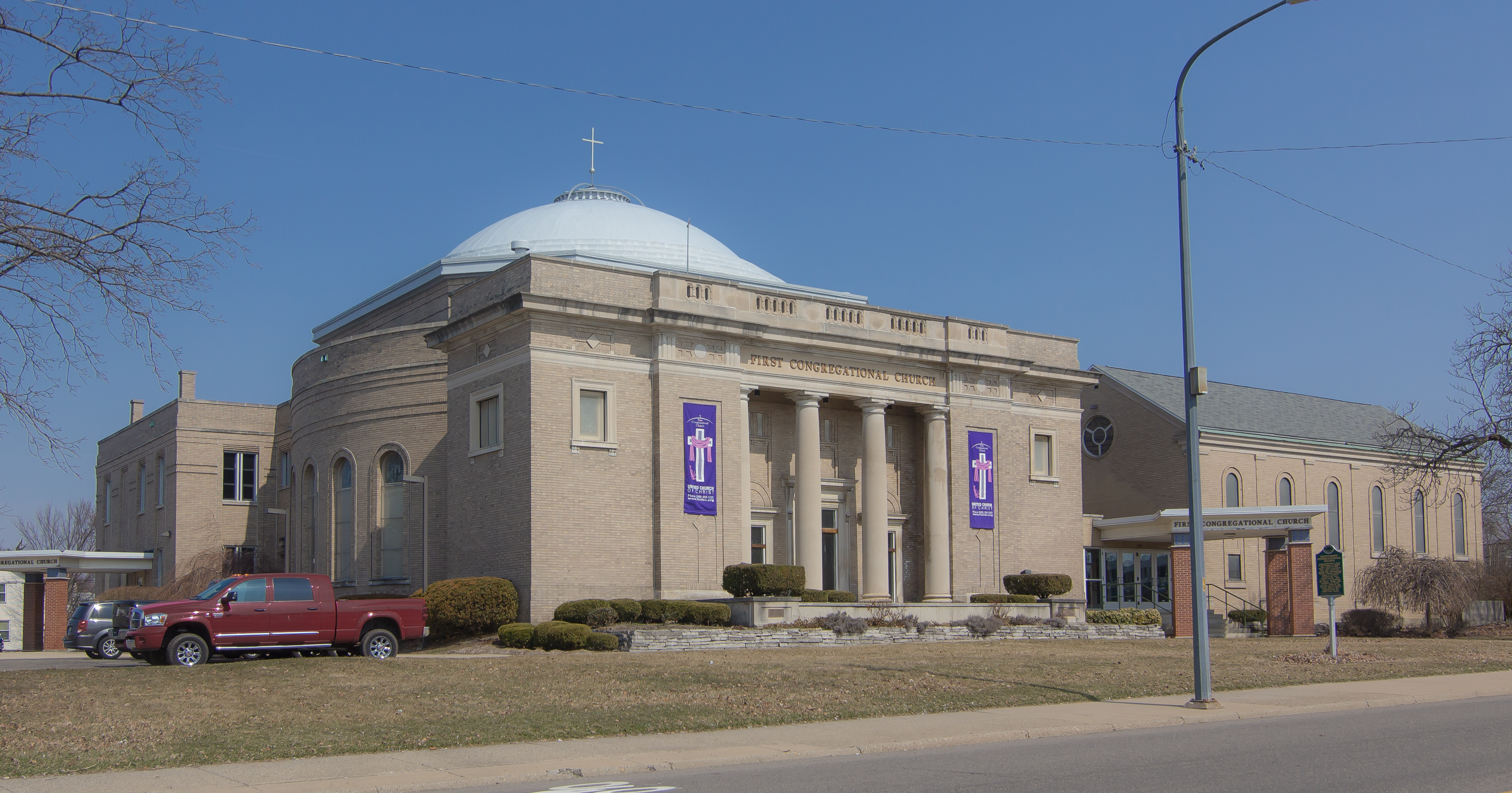
First Congregational Church

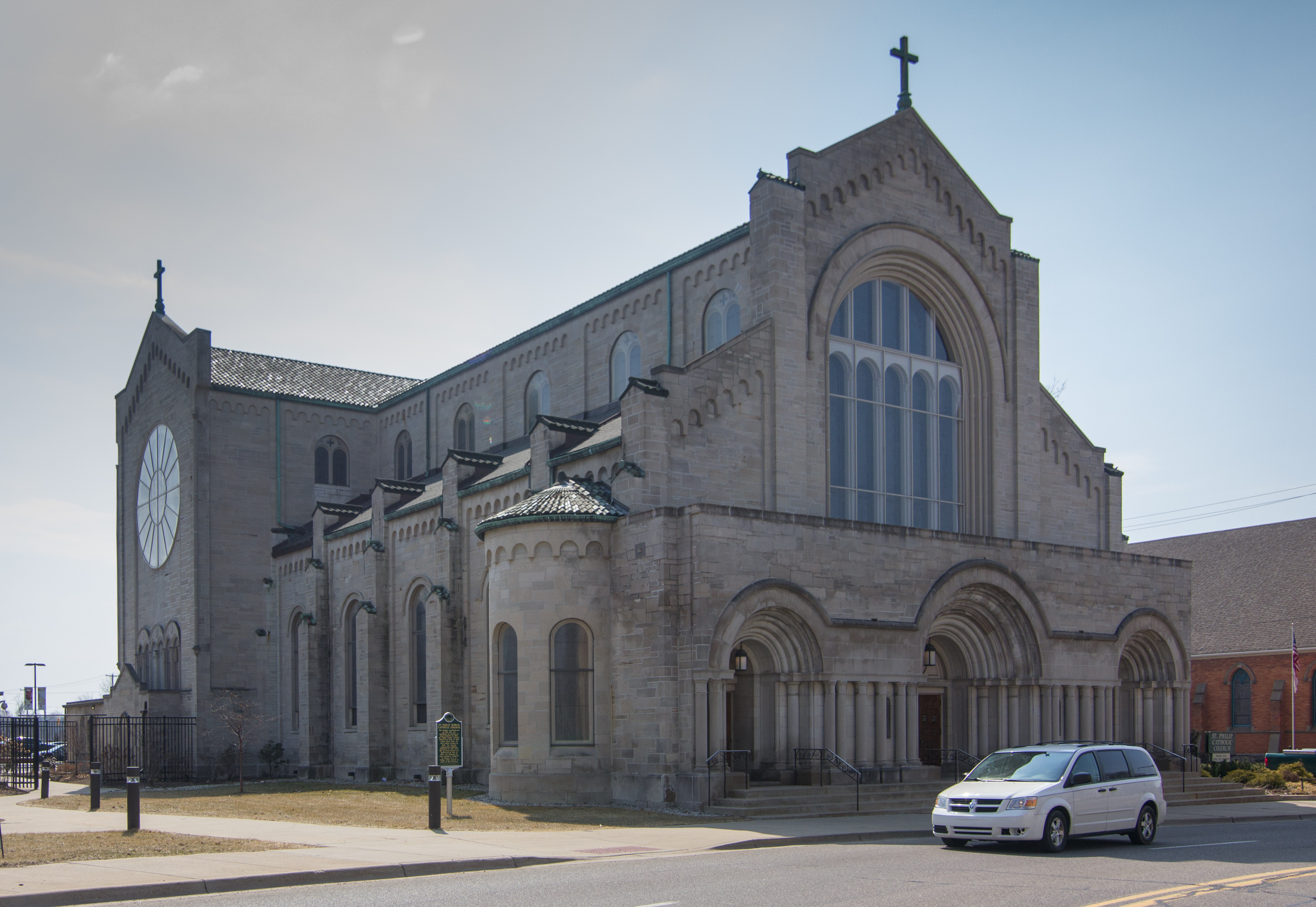
St. Philip Roman Catholic Church
