= Marshall Avenue Bridge (Marshall, Michigan) =

- U.S. National Register of Historic Places
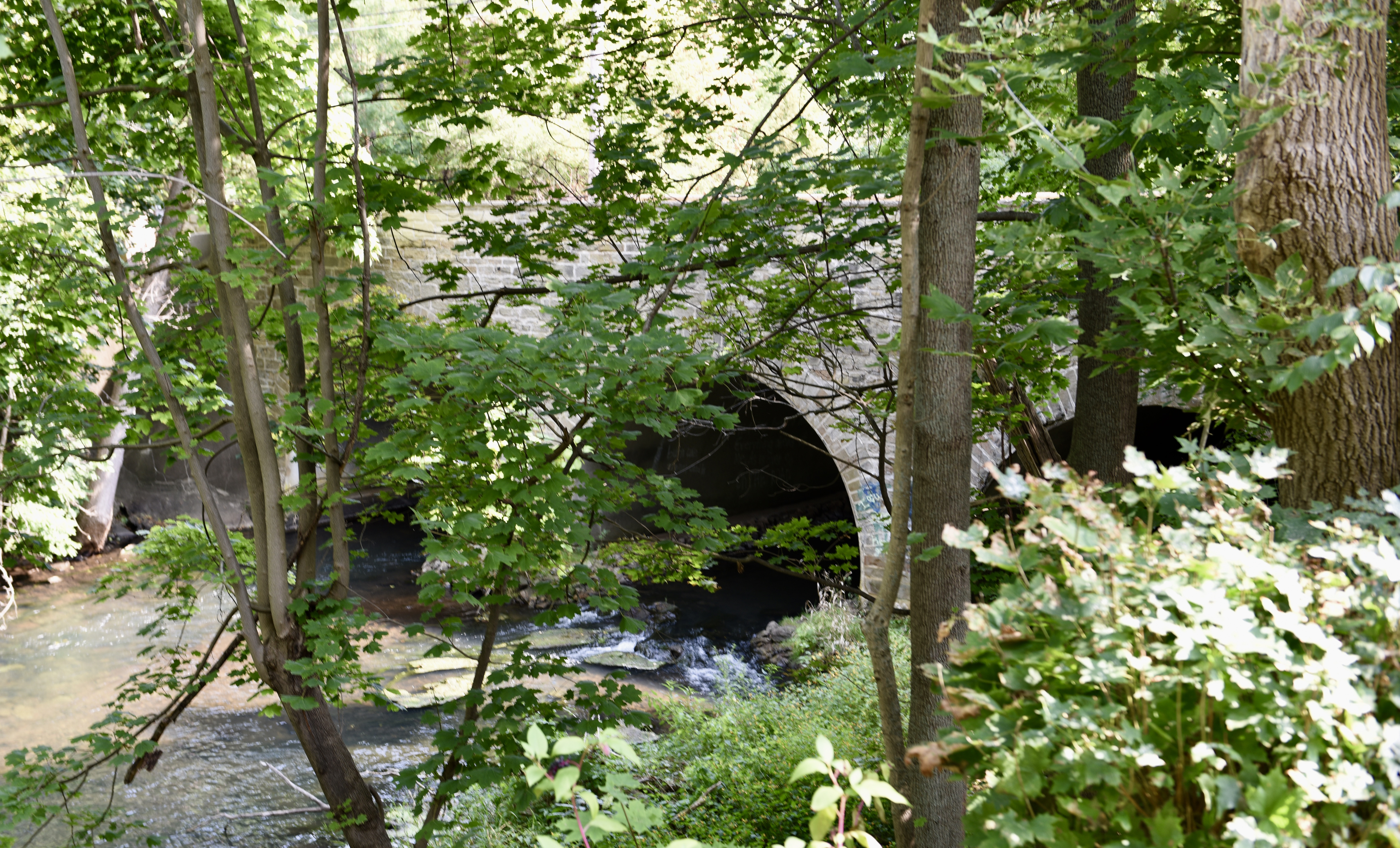
- Interactive map
- Location: Marshall Ave. over Rice Cr., Marshall, Michigan
- Coordinates: 42°16′02″N 84°57′16″W
- Area: less than one acre
- Built: 1899
- Architectural style: stone arch bridge
- NRHP reference No.: 01001021
- Added to NRHP: September 24, 2001

The Marshall Avenue Bridge is a bridge carrying Marshall Avenue over Rice Creek in Marshall, Michigan. It was listed on the National Register of Historic Places in 2001. The construction of the bridge, as a multi-span stone masonry arch type, is extremely rare in Michigan because of the lack of good sources of stone material. It is the longest known stone highway bridge in Michigan.

== History ==
The Marshall Avenue Bridge was likely constructed in about 1899, using material from a deposit of sandstone near Marshall. The bridge was renovated in 1951, with much of its surface coated with concrete, greatly detracting from the aesthetics of the original design. It was renovated again in 1996, and the concrete was removed. The bridge is in good repair and open to traffic.

== Description ==
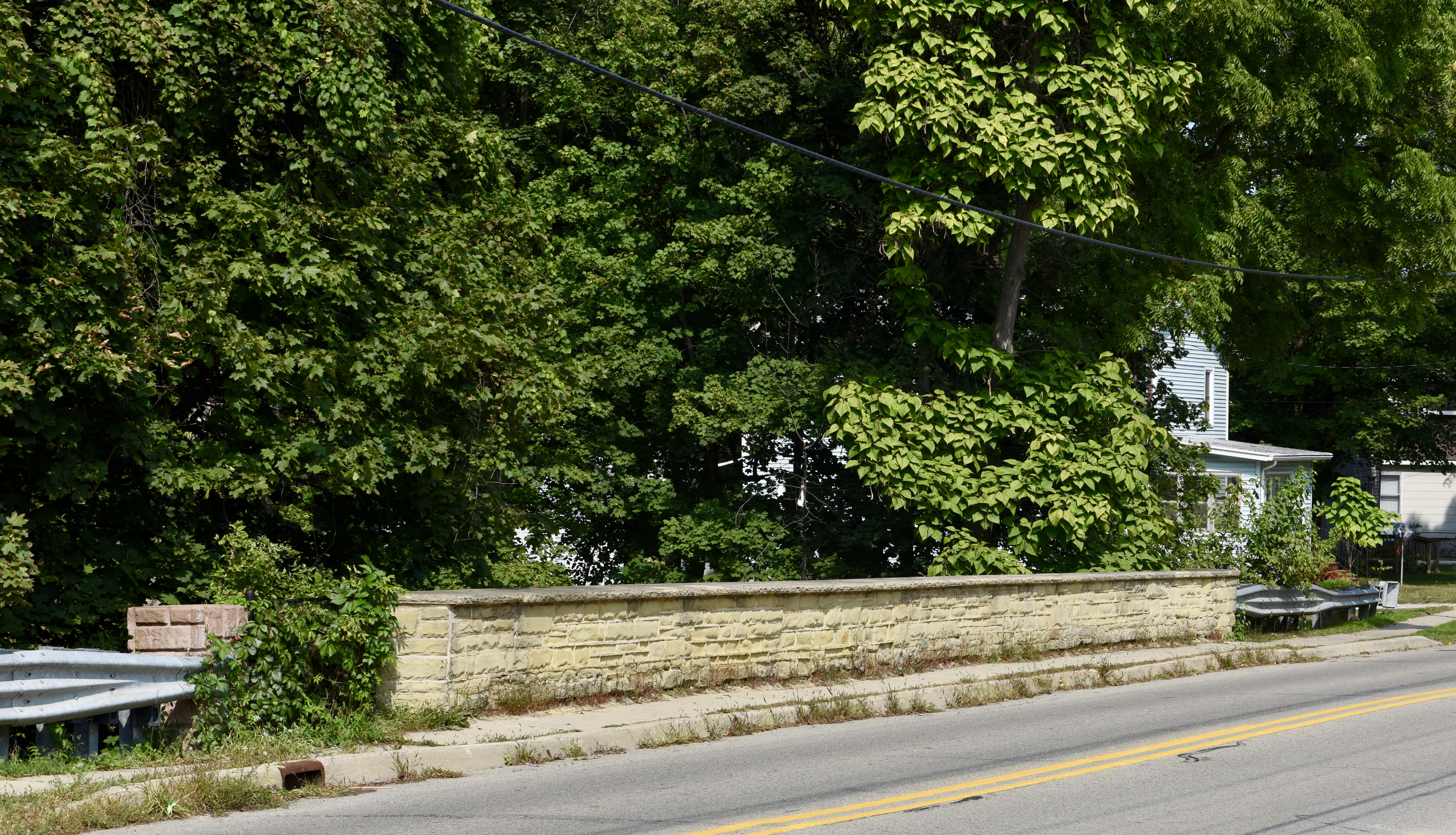
Marshall Avenue Bridge at street level

The Marshall Avenue Bridge is a stone masonry-arch bridge with three 25-foot spans. It has a 42-foot-wide deck, which holds a 35-foot-wide roadway and two sidewalks on either side. The entire length off the structure is 82 feet. The stonework of the bridge rises above the roadway to create solid railings along each side of the bridge, topped by concrete coping. The stonework also extends beyond each end of the bridge into the abutments and flared wing walls. Below the roadway, the spans are defined by broad archivolts outlined by narrow voussoirs. The surface of the arch barrels are lined with concrete.
