= James Treadwell =

James Treadwell is a British former academic, now an author of novels.

== Biography ==
Born in West London, he was influenced in his youth by reading Roger Lancelyn Green’s Myths of the Norsemen, Barbara Leonie Picard’s retellings of the Iliad and Odyssey, and fantasy series including the Narnia, Middle Earth, Gormenghast, Earthsea, and Pern stories and Susan Cooper’s Britain. He frequently played Dungeons & Dragons at school. He continued to read fantasy at university.

Treadwell became an academic specialising in 18th- and 19th-century British literature. He wrote on history before leaving academia to become a full-time writer of fantasy novels. He has lived in Oxford and Montréal, before settling in London.

== Advent ==
The first book of his Advent Trilogy was released in 2012. Treadwell's intention is to explore the terror that would result if magic were to become reality rather than escapism. In the story, magic was once an actual daily reality on Earth, but was destroyed in the Renaissance. It now suddenly returns in the modern world, causing cultural shock and social panic.
