= W. K. Kellogg House =

- W.K. Kellogg House
- U.S. National Register of Historic Places
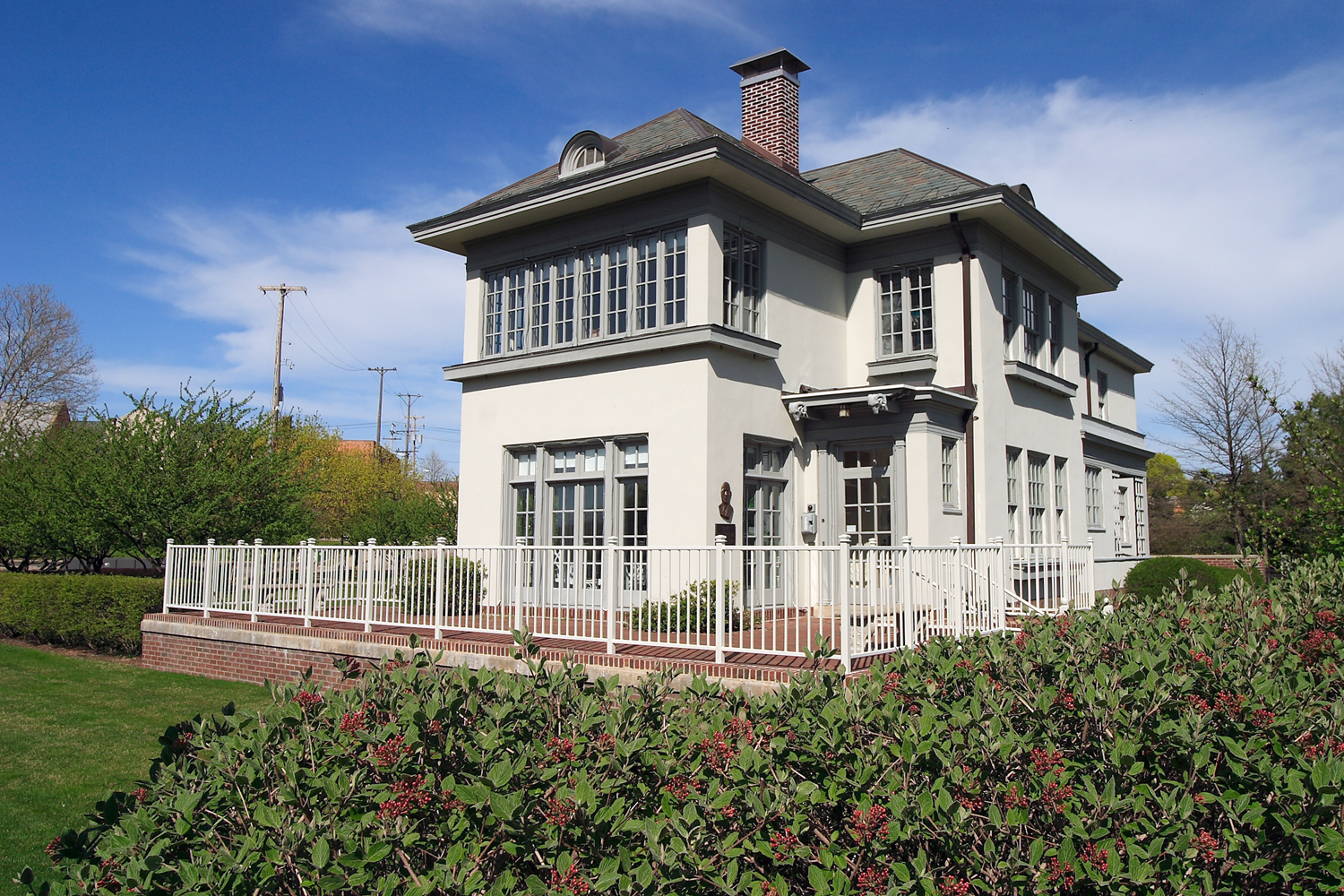
- Interactive map
- Location: 1 Monroe St., Battle Creek, Michigan
- Coordinates: 42°19′10″N 85°10′47″W
- Area: less than one acre
- Built: 1918
- Architectural style: Prairie School
- NRHP reference No.: 85000838
- Added to NRHP: April 18, 1985

The W.K. Kellogg House, located at 1 Monroe Street in Battle Creek, Michigan, was built as a private house for Kellogg Company founder Will Keith Kellogg. It was listed on the National Register of Historic Places in 1985. In 1990, it was moved from its original location at 256 West Van Buren Street to its present location near the W.K. Kellogg Foundation headquarters.

== History ==
Beginning in 1880, W.K. Kellogg served as business manager at the Battle Creek Sanitarium, whose head physician at the time was Dr. John Harvey Kellogg, W.K.'s older brother. While there, W.K. experimented with grain-based substitutes for meat and bread, and accidentally discovered a process to manufacture cereal flakes. In 1906, W.K. Kellogg left the sanitarium to start his own company, then called the Battle Creek Toasted Corn Flake Company (later changed to the Kellogg Company). Despite established competition, Kellogg's company quickly became profitable.

In 1909, Kellogg moved into a house located at 2650 W. Van Buren Street. In 1918, he married his second wife, Dr.. Carrie Staines, a physician at the sanitarium. He then had this house constructed next door, at 256 West Van Buren Street. The Kelloggs lived there until 1924, when they moved into an apartment building they owned. In 1927, Kellogg moved his sales manager, Dwight Mahan, into the house at 256 West Van Buren Street. Kellogg continued to own the house into the 1940s. In 1990, the W.K. Kellogg Foundation was in the process of building a new headquarters, and purchased the Kellogg's house. In march of that year, they moved it from its original location to a new site located across the river from their new headquarters. The house is still owned by the Foundation.

== Description ==
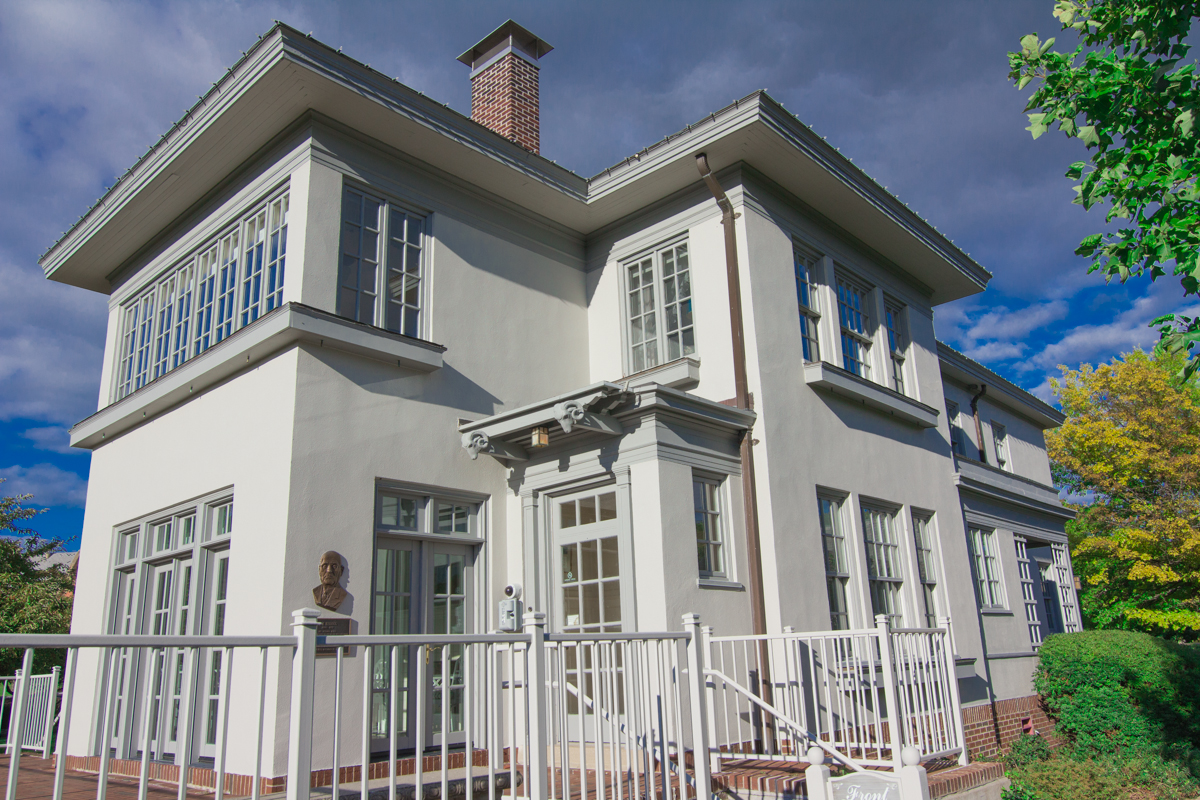
The W.K. Kellogg House

The W. K. Kellogg House is a two-story, T-plan house with a low, slate-covered hipped roof and stucco exterior. The roof has wide, projecting eaves and small round-head dormers. The main facade contains French doors with a transom above, and a band of paired casement windows on the second story. A brick terrace is below the French doors. Other facades have sash-type windows on the upper and lower floors.

The interior of the house contains a parlor, sunroom, dining room, kitchen and pantry on the first floor and four bedrooms, a sunroom, and two bathrooms on the second.
