= Roosevelt American Legion Hospital =

Demolished hospital

- Roosevelt Community House
- Formerly listed on the U.S. National Register of Historic Places
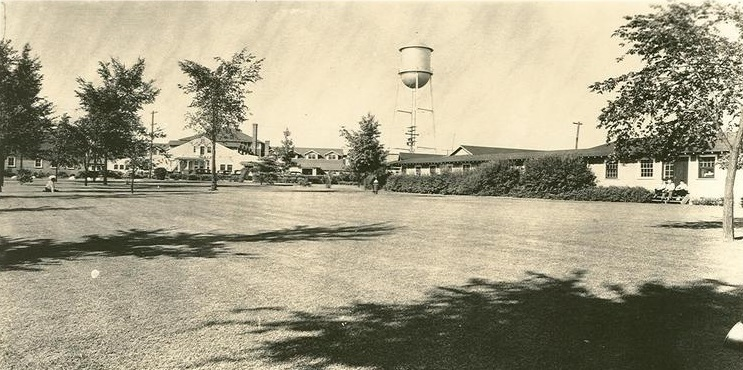
- Roosevelt American Legion Hospital, c. 1930

- Location within Michigan Location within the United States
- Interactive map
- Location: 107 Evergreen Rd., Springfield, Michigan
- Coordinates: 42°20′23″N 85°15′39″W
- Area: 3 acres (1.2 ha)
- Built: 1918
- Engineer: Porter Brothers
- Architectural style: Arts and Crafts
- Demolished: 2016
- NRHP reference No.: 01000653

Significant dates
- Added to NRHP: August 20, 2001
- Removed from NRHP: November 5, 2020

The Roosevelt American Legion Hospital, also known as the 'Roosevelt Community House, the Legion Villa, or The Rotunda, was a health care facility located at 107 Evergreen Road in Springfield, Michigan. It was listed on the National Register of Historic Places in 2001. The building was demolished in 2016, and was removed from the National Register in 2020.

== History ==
In 1917, work began on construction of Fort Custer, for use as a training center for troops drafted to fight in World War I. In 1918, on land directly adjacent to Fort Custer, construction began on the Roosevelt Community House, intended to serve as an officer's club and a hospitality station for family members of the men stationed at Fort Custer. The building was financed by the state of Michigan War Emergency Fund. However, the building was not completely finished until late 1918, after Armistice had been declared. The building was dedicated on January 6, 1919, and named after Theodore Roosevelt, who had died earlier that same day. As the use of Fort Custer wound down, the Roosevelt Community House served as a hospitality station for only a few months.

After the war, the building was purchased by Bernarr Macfadden, a popular proponent of physical culture, as a home for his International Health Resort. However, at the same time there was a rising tide of returning servicemen who had contracted tuberculosis; recognizing the public health crisis, governor Alex Groesbeck purchased the Roosevelt Community House back from Macfadden in 1921. The state then leased it to the American Legion for use as a veteran's hospital, particularly for the care of tuberculosis. Over the years, new buildings were added, and as tuberculosis declined and the Veterans Health Administration began building hospitals, the Roosevelt American Legion Hospital began diversifying, admitting non-veterans and treating other diseases. By 1951, half of the patients were non-veterans.

In the early 1950s, major additions were made to the hospital, and many of the older wooden buildings on the campus, some of which had been moved from Fort Custer after World War I, were razed. The hospital also began to specialize in rehabilitation services, and in 1965 changed its name to the Southwest Regional Rehabilitation Center. It served as a rehabilitation center until 1973, when the hospital moved and the building was repurposed to be a long-term housing and health care facility for veterans, known as the Legion Villa. However, the condition of the building gradually deteriorated, and in 2013, after failed attempts to secure funding for repairs, the facility closed. The property was condemned and the city of Springfield took ownership in 2014. The building was demolished in 2016.

== Description ==
The Roosevelt Community House was a T-shaped, wood-framed Arts and Crafts building. The building had a distinctive, large, three-story open rotunda with a gable roof placed at the intersection of the T. The wings extending outward from the rotunda were 1 1/2 stories tall with gable roofs. The gable roofs contained four dormers on each slope, and porches extended around the building. The siding was originally cedar, but was covered with aluminum in the 1950s. The large rotunda had massive wooden trusses supporting the roof and banks if high windows.

== Gallery ==
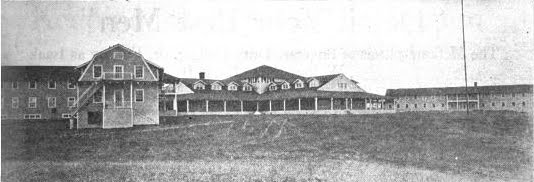
Roosevelt American Legion Hospital, 1922

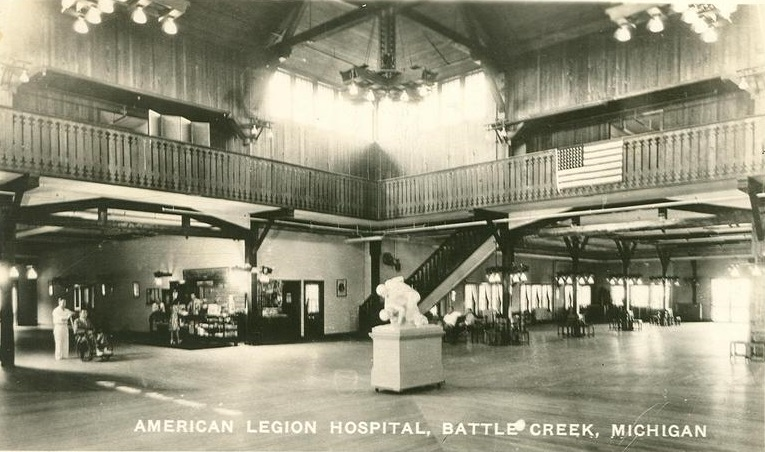
Interior of the rotunda, c. 1930
