= Stonehall (Marshall, Michigan) =

- U.S. National Register of Historic Places
- U.S. National Historic Landmark District – Contributing property
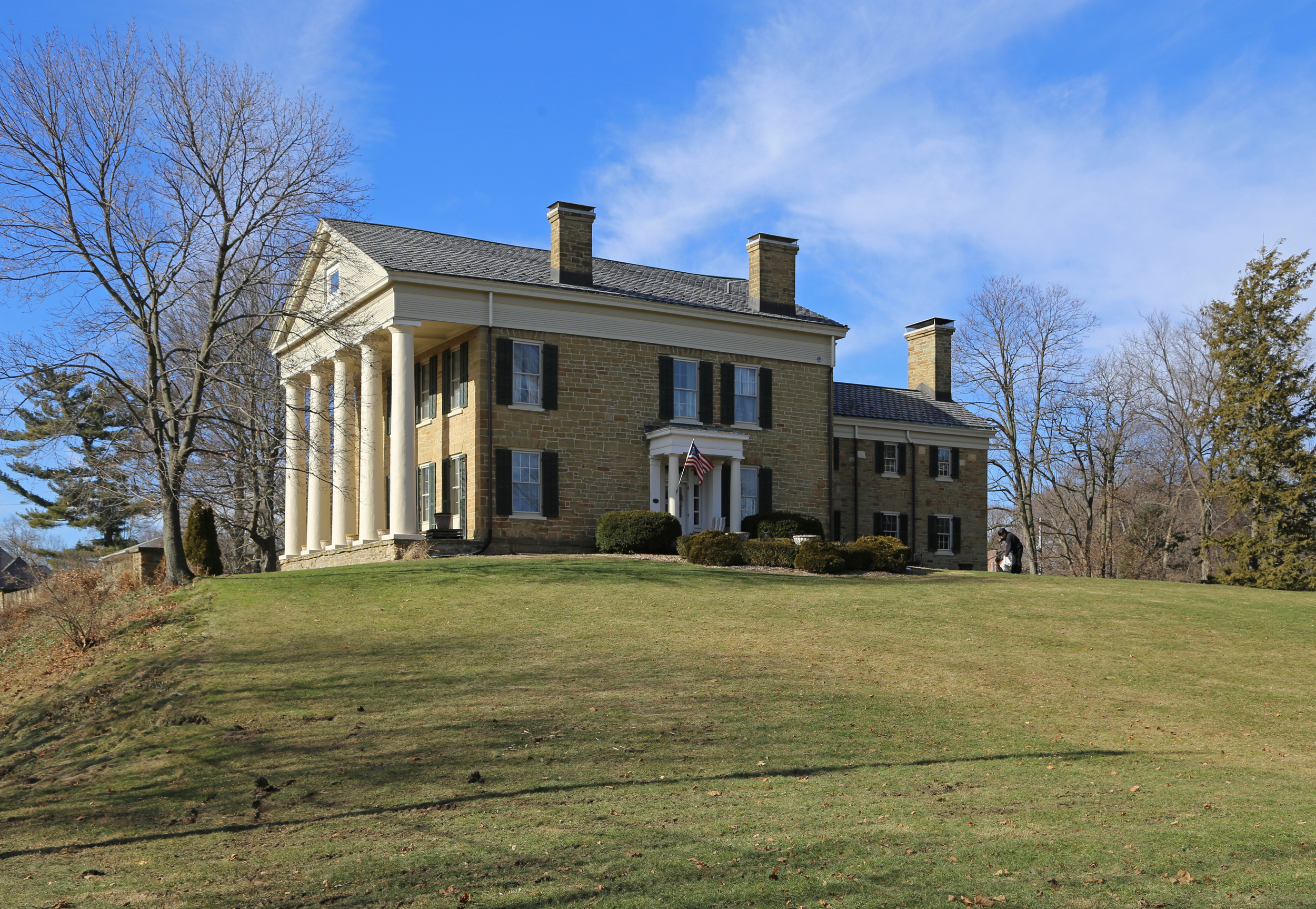
- Interactive map
- Location: 303 N. Kalamazoo St., Marshall, Michigan
- Coordinates: 42°16′27″N 84°57′52″W
- Area: 1 acre (0.40 ha)
- Built: 1837
- Architectural style: Greek Revival
- Part of: Marshall Michigan Historic Landmark District (ID91002053)
- NRHP reference No.: 72000600
- Added to NRHP: June 28, 1972

Stonehall, also known as the Andrew L. Hayes House, is a single-family home located at 303 North Kalamazoo Street in Marshall, Michigan. It was listed on the National Register of Historic Places in 1972. It is often cited as one of the finest examples of Greek Revival architecture in Michigan.

== History ==
Dr. Andrew L. Hayes arrived in Marshall from New Hampshire in 1831, the young community's first doctor. He purchased land, built a shanty, and planted some crops. He built a more substantial log cabin, then brought his family to join him. Hayes prospered, and in 1836 purchased four adjacent lots on which to construct a house. He completed a portion of the new home in 1837, and his family moved in while the remainder of the house was completed in 1838. The Hayes family lived in the house for over thirty years, during which time it became one of the social centers of the community. A large conservatory was added in 1877. The house has gone through a number of subsequent owners, many of them prominent members of the Marshall community. It became known as "Stonehall" around the beginning of the 20th century. It was also used as a home and day school for girls, some time between 1910 and 1924.

== Description ==
Stonehall is a two-story sandstone Greek Revival house, with a basement and a third-floor ballroom. The house features a prominent a portico containing five slender, unfluted Doric columns, a circular window in its tympanum, and white painted wood trim. Four tall windows face the portico. The main entrance is located on one side, sheltered by a small porch with two Doric columns.
