= Advent Historic District =

- U.S. National Register of Historic Places
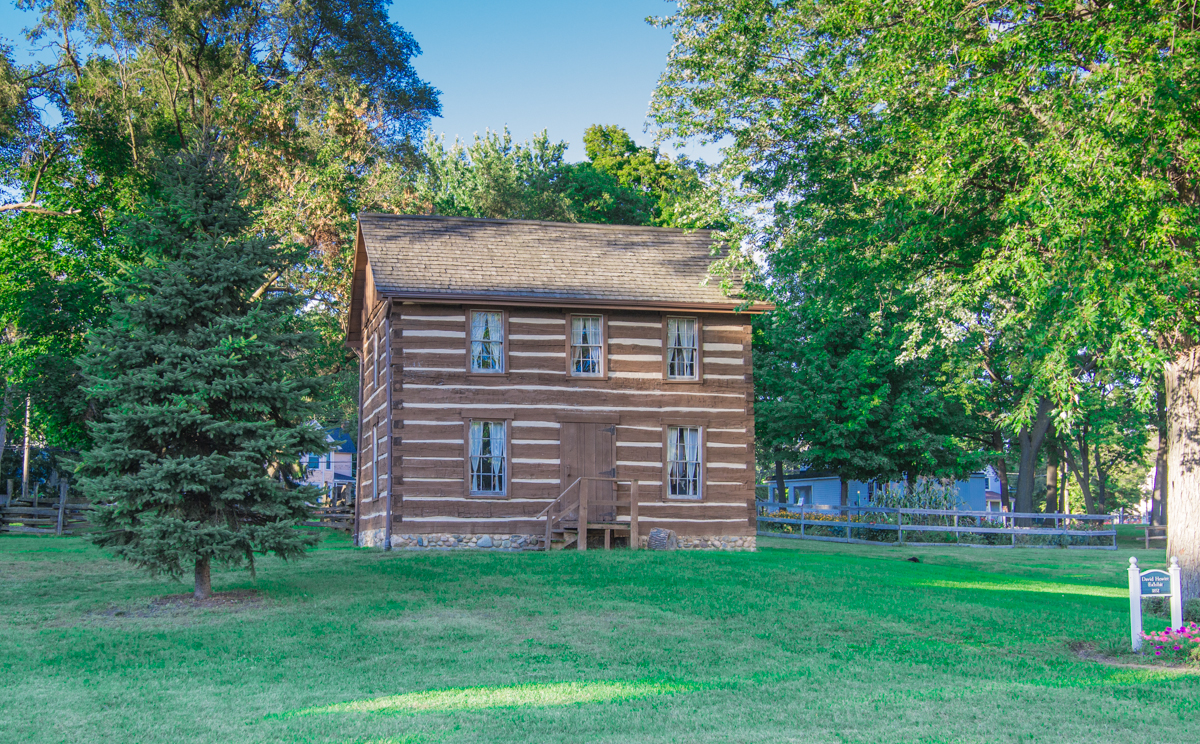
- Interactive map
- Location: Roughly bounded by N. Washington Ave., Champion St., Hubbard St. and Greenwood Ave., Battle Creek, Michigan
- Coordinates: 42°19′48″N 85°11′43″W
- Area: 50 acres (20 ha)
- Architect: Alexander W. Bartholomew, Et al.
- Architectural style: Colonial Revival, Bungalow, American Foursquare, American Craftsman
- NRHP reference No.: 94000623
- Added to NRHP: June 30, 1994

The Advent Historic District is a residential historic district, roughly bounded by North Washington Avenue, Champion Street, Hubbard Street, and Greenwood Avenue, in Battle Creek, Michigan. The district encompasses the heart of the former village of Washington Heights, which was developed as a by-product of the growth of the Seventh-day Adventist Church in the area during the last half of the nineteenth and the early part of the twentieth. The area was annexed into Battle Creek in 1926. It was listed on the National Register of Historic Places in 1994.

== History ==
The first European settlement of this area was by Elias Manchester, who came to the area from New York state in 1836. He constructed a log cabin, and a few years later a brick house, located at what is now the corner of North Washington Avenue and Manchester Street. He platted a portion of his property into 66 lots known as "Manchester's Addition." In 1852, lawyer and future Michigan Supreme Court Justice Benjamin F. Graves purchased the remainder of Manchester's farm. Around the same time, James Springer White and his wife Ellen G. White relocated the headquarters of the Seventh-day Adventist Church to Battle Creek. A number of Seventh Day Adventist figures, including the Whites, made their homes in the district. In 1889 Graves platted a portion of it into 124 lots, known as "Graves's Addition," and another section into 94 additional lots. The Manchester and Graves Additions together make up the Advent Historic District.

Through the nineteenth century, the number of Adventists in the area grew, and by 1900 over 2000 Adventists lived in the neighborhood in and around the district. However, the church soon began decentralizing its activities, moving them to other communities, and as the twentieth century progressed, the number of Adventists living in the neighborhood gradually decreased.

== Description ==
The Advent Town Historic District consists of an irregularly shaped area spanning several blocks of what was formerly the village of Washington Heights. It includes 181 residences, 173 of which contribute to the historic character of the neighborhood. Most of the homes were built in the latter part of the 19th century and early part of the 20th. The houses in the district include Colonial Revival and American Foursquare residences of brick and stucco, clapboard-covered Bungalows, and stylish American Craftsman houses. They were primarily built as single family homes, although some have subsequently been converted into multi-family rental properties.
