= Joy House (Marshall, Michigan) =

- U.S. National Register of Historic Places
- U.S. National Historic Landmark District – Contributing property
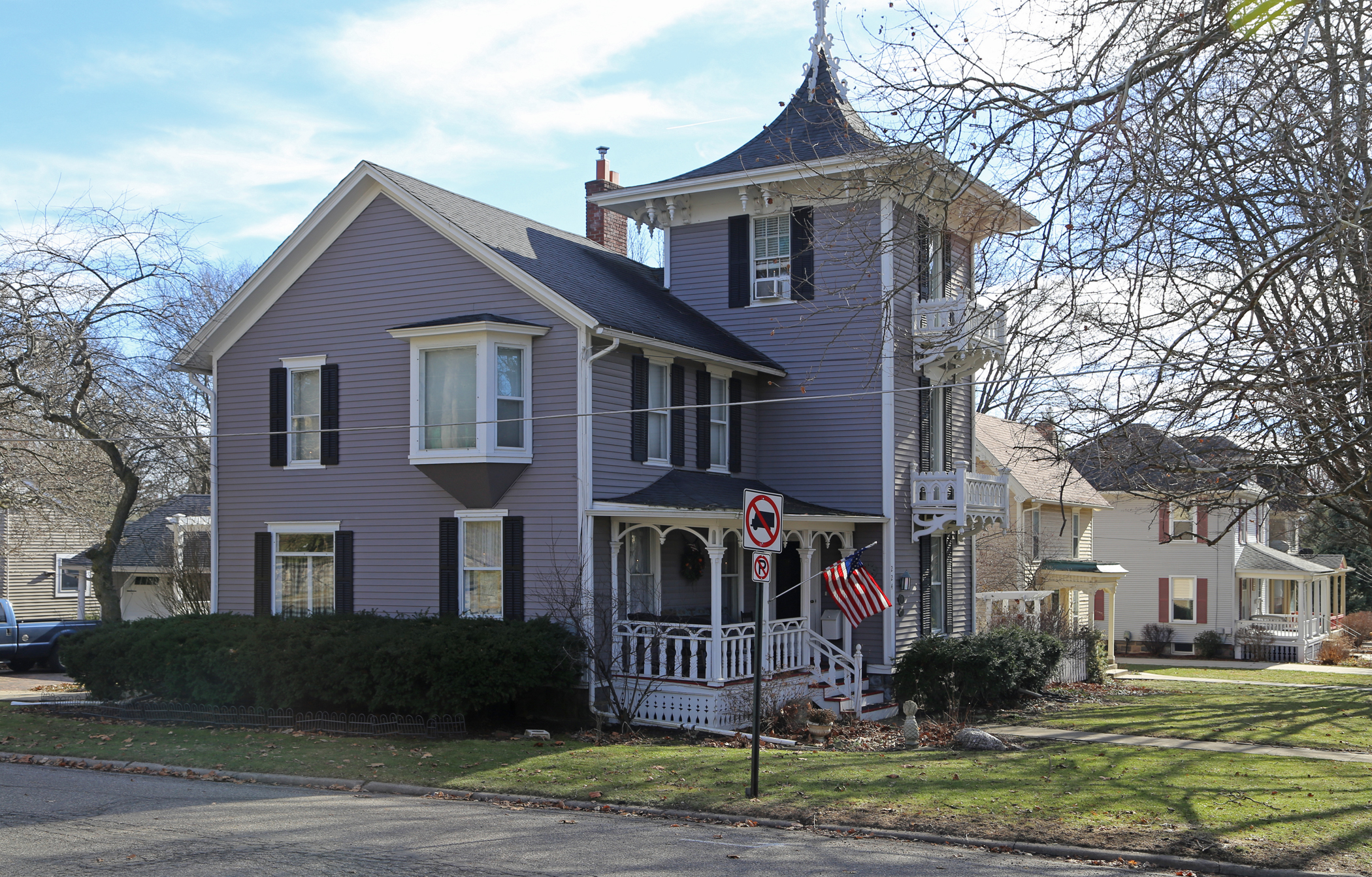
- Interactive map
- Location: 224 N. Kalamazoo Ave., Marshall, Michigan
- Coordinates: 42°16′26″N 84°57′50″W
- Area: less than one acre
- Built: c. 1844
- Architectural style: Italian Villa
- Part of: Marshall Michigan Historic Landmark District (ID91002053)
- NRHP reference No.: 72000599
- Added to NRHP: April 19, 1972

The Joy House, also known as the Benedict-Joy House, is a single-family home located at 224 North Kalamazoo Avenue in Marshall, Michigan. It was listed on the National Register of Historic Places in 1972.

== History ==
Nathan Benedict was born in 1809 in Walton, New York. He apprenticed as a carpenter, and in 1835 same to Michigan. In 1842 he married Louisa Prentice of Marshall, and from 1842 until 1852 he worked as a carpenter and builder in Marshall. In approximately 1844 he constructed this house for his own use. In 1854, the house was purchased by Dr. Henry L. Joy. Joy was born in Ludlowville, New York, in 1822, and graduated from Jefferson Medical College of Philadelphia in 1849. He married Carolyn Schuyler in 1851 in New York, then came directly to Marshall. The Joys added the tower to the home in about 1857. Joy served in a number of municipal offices, including serving as Marshall's mayor in 1877. The Joys live in the house until their deaths: Henry's in 1892 and Carolyn's in 1893. The couples four sons lived in the house after their deaths. It was eventually sold to Richard Walters, and in 1944 to Robert J. Sackett.

== Description ==
The Joy house is a two-story frame structure with clapboards and a gabled roof, built in a style somewhat reminiscent of the Italian Villa style. The windows are double-hung sash units with plain trim. The most distinctive feature of the house is the three-story corner tower, with a pyramidal roof and crocketed finial somewhat like a pagoda. The tower has box cornices, and two front windows with bracketed balconies and cornices. The front porch is also bracketed, and framed by square columns.
