= Marengo Township, Michigan =

- Township
- Location within the state of Michigan
- Coordinates: 42°17′12″N 84°53′50″W
- Country: United States
- State: Michigan
- County: Calhoun

Area
  - Total: 35.7 sq mi (92.5 km^{2})
  - Land: 35.0 sq mi (90.7 km^{2})
  - Water: 0.69 sq mi (1.8 km^{2})
- Elevation: 961 ft (293 m)

Population (2020)
  - Total: 2,205
  - Density: 63.0/sq mi (24.3/km^{2})
- Time zone: UTC-5 (Eastern (EST))
  - Summer (DST): UTC-4 (EDT)
- FIPS code: 26-51520
- GNIS feature ID: 1626684
- Website: https://marengomi.gov/

Marengo Township is a civil township of Calhoun County in the U.S. state of Michigan. It is part of the Battle Creek, Michigan Metropolitan Statistical Area. As of the 2020 census, the township population was 2,205.

== Communities ==
- Marengo is an unincorporated community located just south of Interstate 94 at 42°16′17″N 84°50′55″W along the Kalamazoo River and just south of the junction of Michigan Avenue and 23 Mile Road. The township hall is located here. The first records of land ownership in the township all date from 1831. The first township meeting was held in 1833. The name was inspired by Napoleon's victory at the Battle of Marengo.
- The city of Marshall has incorporated land from the western edge of the township.
- The city of Albion is just a few miles to the east.

== Geography ==
According to the United States Census Bureau, the township has a total area of 35.7 square miles (92.5 km^{2}), of which 35.0 square miles (90.7 km^{2}) is land and 0.69 square miles (1.8 km^{2}), or 1.90%, is water.

== Demographics ==
Historical population
Census	Pop.	Note	%±
1960	1,860		—
1970	1,861		0.1%
1980	1,811		−2.7%
1990	1,801		−0.6%
2000	2,131		18.3%
2010	2,213		3.8%
2020	2,205		−0.4%
Source: Census Bureau. Census 1960- 2000, 2010.

As of the census of 2000, there were 2,131 people, 786 households, and 623 families residing in the township. The population density was 60.5 inhabitants per square mile (23.4/km^{2}). There were 822 housing units at an average density of 23.3 units per square mile (9.0 units/km^{2}). The racial makeup of the township was 96.72% White, 0.38% African American, 0.70% Native American, 0.09% Asian, 0.70% from other races, and 1.41% from two or more races. Hispanic or Latino of any race were 2.67% of the population.

There were 786 households, out of which 35.1% had children under the age of 18 living with them, 65.6% were married couples living together, 9.4% had a female householder with no husband present, and 20.7% were non-families. 17.8% of all households were made up of individuals, and 6.7% had someone living alone who was 65 years of age or older. The average household size was 2.71 and the average family size was 3.04.

In the township the population was spread out, with 26.2% under the age of 18, 7.7% from 18 to 24, 27.4% from 25 to 44, 27.3% from 45 to 64, and 11.5% who were 65 years of age or older. The median age was 37 years. For every 100 females, there were 97.9 males. For every 100 females age 18 and over, there were 96.6 males.

The median income for a household in the township was $50,473, and the median income for a family was $53,348. Males had a median income of $37,829 versus $25,362 for females. The per capita income for the township was $18,550. About 6.5% of families and 8.0% of the population were below the poverty line, including 10.8% of those under age 18 and 4.3% of those age 65 or over.
