= List of Michigan State Historic Sites in Calhoun County =

Location of Calhoun County in Michigan

The following is a list of Michigan State Historic Sites in Calhoun County, Michigan. Sites marked with a dagger (†) are also listed on the National Register of Historic Places in Calhoun County, Michigan.

== Current listings ==
Name	Image	Location	City	Listing date
African Methodist Episcopal Church	African Methodist Episcopal Church	364 West Van Buren Street	Battle Creek	November 21, 1991
Albion College Astronomical Observatory		East Cass Street, Albion College Campus	Albion	January 25, 1985
Albion College Informational Designation	Albion College	Ingham Street and Michigan Avenue	Albion	January 25, 1985
American Museum of Magic	American Museum of Magic	107 E. Michigan Avenue	Marshall	August 23, 1985
Battle Creek City Hall†	Battle Creek City Hall	13 N. Michigan Avenue	Battle Creek	August 12, 1983
Battle Creek House	Battle Creek House	2 West Michigan Avenue	Battle Creek	June 26, 1959
Battle Creek No. 4 Fire Station	Battle Creek No.4 Fire Station	175 Kendall Street	Battle Creek	May 16, 1991
Battle Creek Post Office†	Battle Creek Post Office	67 East Michigan Avenue	Battle Creek	May 17, 1973
Battle Creek Sanitarium†	The Battle Creek Federal Center	74 North Washington Avenue	Battle Creek	September 7, 1989
Battle Creek Toasted Corn Flake Company Informational Site	Cereal Bowl of America	235 Porter Street	Battle Creek	May 13, 1981
Beckley Cemetery	Beckley Cemetery	Helmer and Beckley roads	Battle Creek	September 29, 1972
Beckley School	Beckley School	3019 Beckley Road	Battle Creek	August 27, 1970
Bedford Mill		23178 North Bedford Road	Bedford Township	June 2, 1966 Destroyed by arson July 8, 2014
Birthplace of "The Old Rugged Cross" informational designation		1101 East Michigan Avenue	Albion	May 1, 1959
Birthplace of Famed Song ("Sweetheart of Sigma Chi") Informational Designation		Albion College Campus, South Hall	Albion	May 1, 1959
Breakfast Food Industry Informational Designation		Bailey Park, NE Capital Avenue at M-78	Battle Creek	January 19, 1957
James and Anne Atmore Bryant Farmstead†		12557 L Dr. N. (Convis Township)	Wattles Park	June 20, 2002
Butler-Boyce House		1110 Verona Road	Marshall	June 15, 1979
Calhoun County Fair	Calhoun County Fair	Between Fair St. and Washington Ave, east of Marshall Ave	Marshall	February 11, 1972
Capitol Hill School†	CapitalHillSchoolMarshall	603 Washington Street	Marshall	April 23, 1971
Cobblestone School-demolished	Cobblestone School-demolished.	North Drive West and 11 Mile Road	Pennfield Township	August 13, 1971
Seirn B. Cole House	Seirn Cole House	276 Capital Avenue NE	Battle Creek	January 22, 1987
Samuel and Elizabeth Galloway Coleman House	Samuel Coleman House	923 Willow Street, corner of Homer	Marshall	January 23, 1997
Oliver C. Comstock Jr. House	Oliver C. Comstock House	203 South Marshall Avenue	Marshall	February 27, 1980
William Wallace Cook House	William Wallace Cook House	603 North Kalamazoo	Marshall	March 14, 1973
Cortright-Van Patten Mill†		109 Byron	Homer	February 7, 1977 Burned down on May 16, 2010
Isaac E. Crary House	Issac Crary House	107 North Park Street, Town Square	Marshall	March 14, 1973
Jeremiah Cronin Jr. House		407 North Madison Street	Marshall	July 16, 1992
Crosswhite Fugitive Slave Case Informational Designation		East Michigan Avenue and East Mansion Street	Marshall	February 18, 1956
Del Shannon "Runaway" Informational Site		45 Capital Ave., S.W., Southeast corner of Hamblin and Capital avenues	Battle Creek	June 21, 1990
Duck Lake School	Duck Lake School	500 North Shore Dr.	Springport	August 8, 2005
Elks Temple-demolished		14 North McCamly Street	Battle Creek	November 16, 1981 Demolished in 1987
Emporium†	EmporiumMarshall	154-156 West Michigan Avenue	Marshall	February 23, 1981
Faust Block	Faust Block	107 East Michigan Avenue	Marshall	June 20, 1985
First Baptist Church	First Baptist Church	305 West Michigan Avenue	Marshall	April 23, 1985
First Baptist Church	First Baptist Church	80 East Michigan Ave	Battle Creek	August 9, 1959
First Home in Albion Informational Site	The First Home	303 East Erie Street	Albion	August 25, 1960
First National Bank of Marshall	First National Bank of Marshall	117 East Michigan Avenue	Marshall	November 15, 1990
First Presbyterian Church		305 East Porter Street	Albion	December 20, 1989
First Presbyterian Church-Homer	First Presbyterian Church -Homer	309 S. Sophia St.	Homer	August 13, 1981
Jabez S. Fitch House† (Also known as the Harold C. Brooks House)	Jabez S. Fitch House	310 North Kalamazoo Avenue	Marshall	February 17, 1965
Floral Hall	Floral Hall-Calhoun County Fairgrounds	Calhoun County Fairgrounds	Marshall	July 26, 1974
Fort Custer	Fort Custer Training Center	Dickman Road	Battle Creek	September 17, 1957
G.A.R. Hall	Grand Army of the Republic Hall	West Michigan Ave at Exchange St	Marshall	January 27, 1983
Gale Manufacturing Co. Office Building	Gale Manufacturing	105 North Albion Street	Albion	June 18, 1982
Orlando C. Gale House		220 West Mulberry Street	Albion	September 14, 1995
A. P. Gardner Mansion†	A. P. Gardner Mansion	509 South Superior Street	Albion	January 22, 1971
Charles T. Gorham Informational Designation		Michigan National Bank, 124 W Michigan	Marshall	November 3, 1976
Governor's Mansion†	Governor's Mansion	621 South Marshall Avenue	Marshall	February 11, 1972
Harmonia Cemetery		15th Street	Bedford Township	November 30, 1983
Hawkins Farm Informational Designation		18935 15 1/2 Mile Road	Marshall	July 23, 1985
Andrew L. Hayes House	Andrew H. Hayes House	303 North Kalamazoo Street	Marshall	February 17, 1965
Sam Hill House	Sam Hill House	139 W Mansion St	Marshall	July 26, 1974
H. Eugene Hollon House	H. Eugene Holland House	215 South Eagle Street	Marshall	March 20, 1984
Holy Ascension of Christ Orthodox Church	Holy Ascension Church	810 Austin Avenue	Albion	November 16, 1981
Homer Fire Station	Homer Fire Station	128 East Main Street	Homer	January 16, 1976
Erastus and Sarah Hussey Residence and Store Informational Site		Kellogg Foundation Headquarters, One Michigan Avenue	Battle Creek	March 19, 1992
Joy House†	Joy House	224 North Kalamazoo Avenue	Marshall	August 13, 1971
Independent Congregational Church	Independent Congregational Church	145 N. E. Capital	Battle Creek	August 13, 2008
Interurban Depot	Interurban Depot	220 W. Michigan	Marshall	July 8, 2012
Kellogg Community College Informational Designation		450 North Avenue	Battle Creek	March 14, 2012
Ketchum Park	Ketchum Park	South Marshall Street between Fair and Washington streets	Marshall	February 11, 1972
Kimball House	Kimball House	196 Capital Avenue	Battle Creek	September 21, 1976
Isaac Lockwood House†	Isaac Lockwood House	14011 Verona Road	Marshall	January 23, 1992
Log School House Informational Site		East State and Monroe streets	Battle Creek	June 5, 1959
Marengo Pioneer Cemetery		West Michigan Avenue at 21 Mile Road	Marengo Township	May 1, 1959
Marshall House	Marshall House	1 Exchange St	Marshall	February 27, 1980
Marshall Informational Designation	Marshall, Michigan	Town Square, East Main Street (city property south of the Honolulu House)	Marshall	February 11, 1972
Marshall Middle School	Marshall Middle School	400 Marshall Avenue	Marshall	January 19, 1978
Marshall Public Schools Pioneer School House Informational Site	Pioneer School	200 West Mansion	Marshall	March 19, 1987
Marshall Region	Marshall Downtown	I-94 at US-27	Marshall	August 25, 1960
Marshall Tavern	Marshall Tavern	West Michigan Avenue and South Eagle Street	Marshall	February 19, 1958
Mary Bryant Mayo Birthplace	Mary Mayo House	12557 L. Drive North, east of 12 Mile Road	Battle Creek	April 4, 1978
Charles Merritt House	Charles Merritt House	327 North Capital Avenue	Battle Creek	August 3, 1979
Methodism in Battle Creek	Methodism in Battle Creek	114 East Michigan Avenue	Battle Creek	May 1, 1959
Michigan Central Railroad Station†	Michigan Central Railroad Station	44 McCamly	Battle Creek	November 6, 1970
Mary Miller House Hillside	Mary Miller House	224 West Prospect	Marshall	2006
James A. Miner Informational Site	James Miner	156 West Michigan Avenue	Marshall	February 23, 1981
Mother's Day in Albion Informational Designation		Rieger Park, southeast corner of Ionia and Erie streets	Albion	March 15, 1990
National House†	National House	102 South Parkview	Marshall	January 16, 1976
Nottawasippi Reservation†	Athens Indian Church	1 mile West of Athens	Athens	June 16, 1972
Oakhill†	Oakhill	410 North Eagle Street	Marshall	July 26, 1974
Oakridge Cemetery	Oakridge Cemetery	614 Dibble Street	Marshall	June 30, 1988
Thomas O'Brien Informational Designation	Thomas O'Brien	117 E. Michigan	Marshall	August 23, 1990
Penniman Castle†	Penniman Castle	443 Main Street	Battle Creek	July 15, 1999
Horace Perrin Informational Site		906 S. Marshall	Marshall	August 8, 2009
John D. Pierce Homesite	Pierce-Slater House	314 West Mansion	Marshall	February 21, 1975
Planning Michigan's Public School System Informational Designation		310 N Kalamazoo Avenue	Marshall	February 18, 1956
C.W. Post	C.W. Post	30 E. Michigan in Monument Park	Battle Creek	2003
Postum Cereal Company / Factory Informational Designation		245 Cliff Street	Battle Creek	2003
Abner Pratt House/Honolulu House†	Honolulu House	107 North Kalamazoo Street	Marshall	February 17, 1965
Daniel Pratt House†	Daniel Pratt House	122 North High Street	Marshall	August 13, 1971
William Prindle Livery Stable (Old Stone Barn)†	William Prindle Livery Stable	323 West Michigan Avenue (South Kalamazoo at Fountain Circle?)	Marshall	March 14, 1973
Railroad Union Birthplace Informational Designation	Railroad Union Birthplace	633 West Hanover	Battle Creek	August 23, 1974
Harvey N. Randall House	Harvey Randall House	103 East North Street	Tekonsha	November 20, 1987
Riverside Cemetery Complex		1301 Superior Street	Albion	August 29, 1996
Eugene P. Robertson House†	Eugene P. Robertson House	412 South Clinton Street	Albion	February 18, 1982
Saint Thomas Episcopal Church	St. Thomas Episcopal Church	72 Capital Avenue Northeast	Battle Creek	May 1, 1959
St. Philip Roman Catholic Church	St. Philip Roman Catholic Church	112 Capital Avenue Northeast	Battle Creek	March 14, 2012
Schellenberger Tavern		507 West Hanover Street	Marshall	November 3, 1976
Nelle Zinn Burt Scheuch Estate		6174 Halbert Road	Battle Creek	November 15, 1990
Win Schuler's Inn	Win Schulers Inn	115 South Eagle Street	Marshall	August 6, 1976
Second Baptist Church Commemorative Designation		485 Washington Street	Battle Creek	June 29, 2000
Seventh Day Adventist Church	Seventh Day Adventist Church-Battle Creek	19 North Washington and Van Buren Streets	Battle Creek	October 14, 1959
Warren B. Shepard House	Warren B. Shepard House	373 Riverside Drive	Battle Creek	September 21, 1988
Smith-Gillespie House		811 East Michigan Avenue	Albion	February 7, 1977
Sonoma United Methodist Church (now the Grace Fellowship Baptist Church)	Somona United Methodist Church	4790 Capital Avenue, SW	Battle Creek	March 16, 1989
Starr Commonwealth for Boys	Starr Commonwealth for Boys	26 Mile Road (Starr Commonwealth Road)	Sheridan Township	July 17, 1981
Stevenson House	Stevenson House	41 Orchard Place	Battle Creek	November 7, 1977
Stow-Hasbrouck House†	Stow-Hasbrouck House	17051 16 Mile Rd	Marshall	June 15, 1984
Tekonsha Township Hall	Tekonsa Town Hall	109 E. Canal Street	Tekonsha	June 15, 1979
Tekonsha Village Jail	Tekonsa Jail	111 Canal Street	Tekonsha	August 29, 1996
Jared C. Thompson House		633 West Hanover Street	Marshall	April 5, 1974
Trinity Episcopal Church	Trinity Episcopal Church	101 East Mansion Street	Marshall	February 27, 1980
Union Manufacturing Company-demolished		87 Capital Avenue, SW	Battle Creek	March 28, 1985
United States Post Office		202 East Michigan Ave	Marshall	January 13, 1982
Veterans Hospital No. 100, Camp Custer	Veterans Hospital No. 100. This building has been demolished.	5500 Armstrong Rd	Battle Creek	December 20, 1989
Wagner's Block†	Wagner's Block	143 West Michigan Avenue	Marshall	October 29, 1971
Ward Mill / Ward Building Informational Site	Ward Mill Site	37 Capital NE	Battle Creek	October 12, 1990
James and Ellen G. White Grave Site	James White Gravesite. Founder of Seventh Day Adventist Church. His grave is front, left. His wife is to his left.	Located in Oak Hill Cemetery, 255 South Avenue Lot #320	Battle Creek	July 23, 1985
Allen and Charles Willard House	Willard House	965 Capital Avenue SW	Battle Creek	March 16, 1989
Lt. George A. Woodruff Informational Site	Lt. George A. Woodruff	614 Dibble Street	Marshall	April 24, 1979

== See also ==
- National Register of Historic Places listings in Calhoun County, Michigan

== Sources ==
- Historic Sites Online – Calhoun County. Michigan State Housing Developmental Authority. Accessed January 5, 2011.
