= Emporium =

Emporium may refer to:

== Historical ==
- Emporium (antiquity), a trading post, factory, or market of Classical antiquity
- Emporium (early medieval), a 6th- to 9th-century trading settlement in Northwestern Europe
- Emporium (Italy), an ancient town on the site of present-day Empoli, Italy
- Emporium (Rome), the river port of ancient Rome
- Emporium (Jamestown, California), a building listed on the US National Register of Historic Places (NRHP) in Tuolumne County
- Emporium (Marshall, Michigan), an NRHP-listed commercial building

== Businesses ==
- A large retail store
- Emporium (Bangkok), a shopping mall in Thailand
- The Emporium (San Francisco), a defunct department store chain based in San Francisco, California, US
- Emporium (Oregon-based department store), a defunct retailer in five western US states
- The Emporium, Leicestershire, a nightclub in Coalville, Leicestershire, UK
- Emporium Mall, in Lahore, Pakistan
- Emporium Mall Pluit, in Pluit, Jakarta, Indonesia
- Emporium Melbourne, a shopping centre in Australia
- Emporium Baku, department store in Baku

== Other uses ==
- Emporium, Pennsylvania, US
- Emporium (short story collection), a 2002 book by Adam Johnson

== See also ==
- Empúries, town founded with the name of Ἐμπόριον (Emporion), in 575 BC, by Greek colonists from Phocaea
- Emporia (disambiguation)
- Emporio (disambiguation)
