= Emporia =

Emporia is the plural form of the Latin emporium may refer to:

== Places in the United States ==
- Emporia, Florida
- Emporia, Indiana
- Emporia, Kansas
- Emporia, Virginia

== Other uses ==
- Emporia (early medieval), a type of trading settlement
- Emporia (moth), a genus of snout moths
- Emporia (shopping mall), a shopping mall in Malmö in southern Sweden
- USS Emporia (PF-28), a frigate of the US Navy
- Queen Emporia, the main protagonist of the Millarworld comic book series Empress, and a supporting character in Big Game

== See also ==
- Emporio (disambiguation)
- Emporion, Catalonia, Spain
- Emporium (disambiguation)
