= Dimmeys =

Australian discount store chain

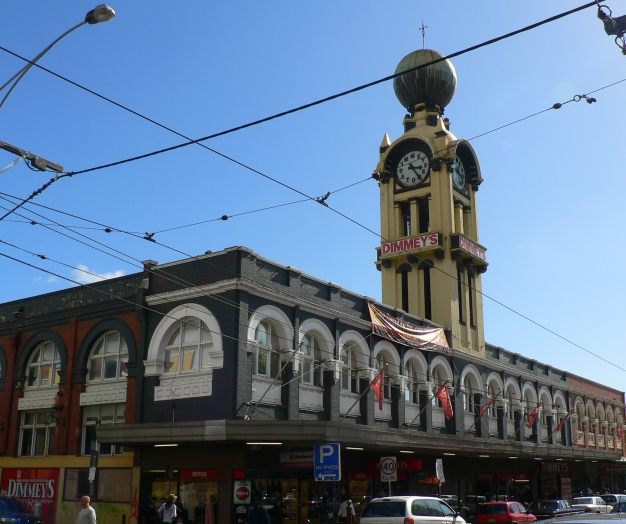
- Former Dimmeys store and clock tower in Richmond, Victoria pictured in 2006
- Type: Discount department store
- Industry: Retail
- Founded: 1853; 173 years ago (as Dimelow & Gaylard's) in Maryborough, Victoria
- Founder: Joseph Britten
- Headquarters: South Melbourne, Victoria, Australia
- Number of locations: 18 (2025)
- Area served: New South Wales, Queensland, South Australia and Victoria
- Products: Apparel, cosmetics, homewares, toys, electrical, manchester, food and general merchandise
- Parent: Range Works Pty Ltd
- Website: dimmeys.com.au

Dimmeys is an Australian discount department store chain. Founded as a gold-rush era drapery "Dimelow & Gaylard's", in rural Maryborough, the business became colloquially known as 'Dimmeys'. In the early 1900s the business name was changed.

Over the late 1900s the chain evolved from larger traditional Department stores to smaller 'bargain stores' in more locations. In 2014, the business had more than 40 stores spread across eastern and southern Australia.

== History ==
In 1898 the Maryborough business Dimelow & Gaylard purchased an existing drapery business, established in 1853 by Joseph Britten, located in Swan Street, Richmond. These premises were built in 1878.

In 1904 the business was acquired in turn by John Jeffery.

The Swan Street store was extensively damaged in a fire in 1906, though it continued to trade until it was entirely rebuilt in 1907 in Romanesque style, designed by architects HW & FB Tompkins. As part of a 1910 extension by the same architects the building was topped with a distinctive clock tower, featuring a globe with red glass panels that were internally illuminated after dark, making it visible for several miles. At this time Jeffery also changed the business name to Dimmeys Model Stores, to reflect its high-fashion status. The tower became a landmark in Richmond, and images of it were incorporated into the company logo and marketing.

In 1939 the World War II blackout restrictions meant that the globe could not be illuminated, and as the glass windows had deteriorated they were replaced with copper panels.

The store sold a variety of merchandise on the ground floor, and on the first floor were workshops and the mail order service for regional customers. During the Great Depression of the 1930s the store began to focus on quality goods at reduced prices. In the post-war period it ceased manufacturing and became a 'bargain store'.

Dimmeys bought out competitor Forges in 1989, and traded as "Dimmeys & Forges". Forges was a large retail site operating in the Melbourne suburb of Footscray. The Forges location was sold off to developers in 2009, and the '& Forges' was dropped from the business name.

== Dimmeys' decline ==
The company collapsed in 1996 with A$27 million in debts, and was sold to a consortium, headed by Doug Zapelli.

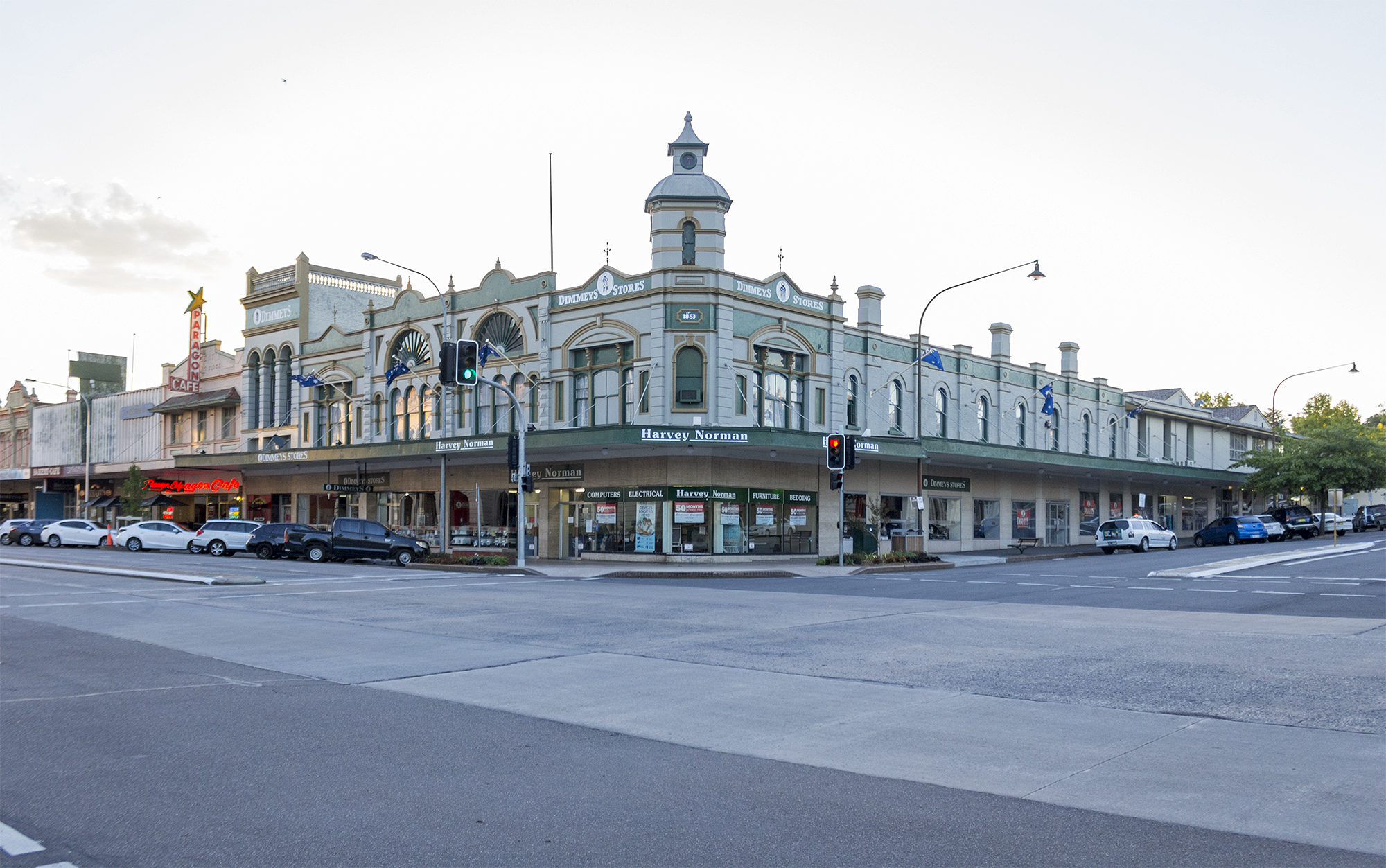
Dimmeys department store in Goulburn, New South Wales pictured in 2016

In 1999, Dimmeys was fined A$60,000 for selling faulty children's bicycles. Two years later, it was fined A$160,000 for selling children's nightwear that did not meet mandatory fire safety standards.

The business was the subject of a 2007 book Dimmeys of Richmond: The Rise and Fall of a Family Business by historian Dr Samuel Furphy.

In 2011, Dimmeys was fined A$400,000 after the Australian Competition & Consumer Commission instigated legal proceedings for selling children's nightwear without correctly attached fire hazard warning labels.

In 2013, Dimmeys was fined A$3 million for breaching product safety laws. The action was brought against Dimmeys and their supplier, Starite Distributors, which is also owned by Zapelli, by the state consumer protection authority, Consumer Affairs Victoria. relating to the safety of certain children's toys and garments sold. In addition to the fine, Dimmeys was also prohibited from selling items that require warnings or high safety standards for the next six years. Zapelli was banned from managing corporations for six years and was fined $120,000. Shortly thereafter, Dimmeys announced that it had entered into voluntary administration appointing SV Partners as the administrators, and was attempting to make arrangements that would allow it to continue trading while paying off the fine, and was also exploring the option of sale of some or all of its assets.

In March 2014, Dimmeys was bought by Cool Breeze Clothing which was described by an administrator as "a startup company established specifically for the purpose of purchasing Dimmeys" with people connected to the industry behind it.

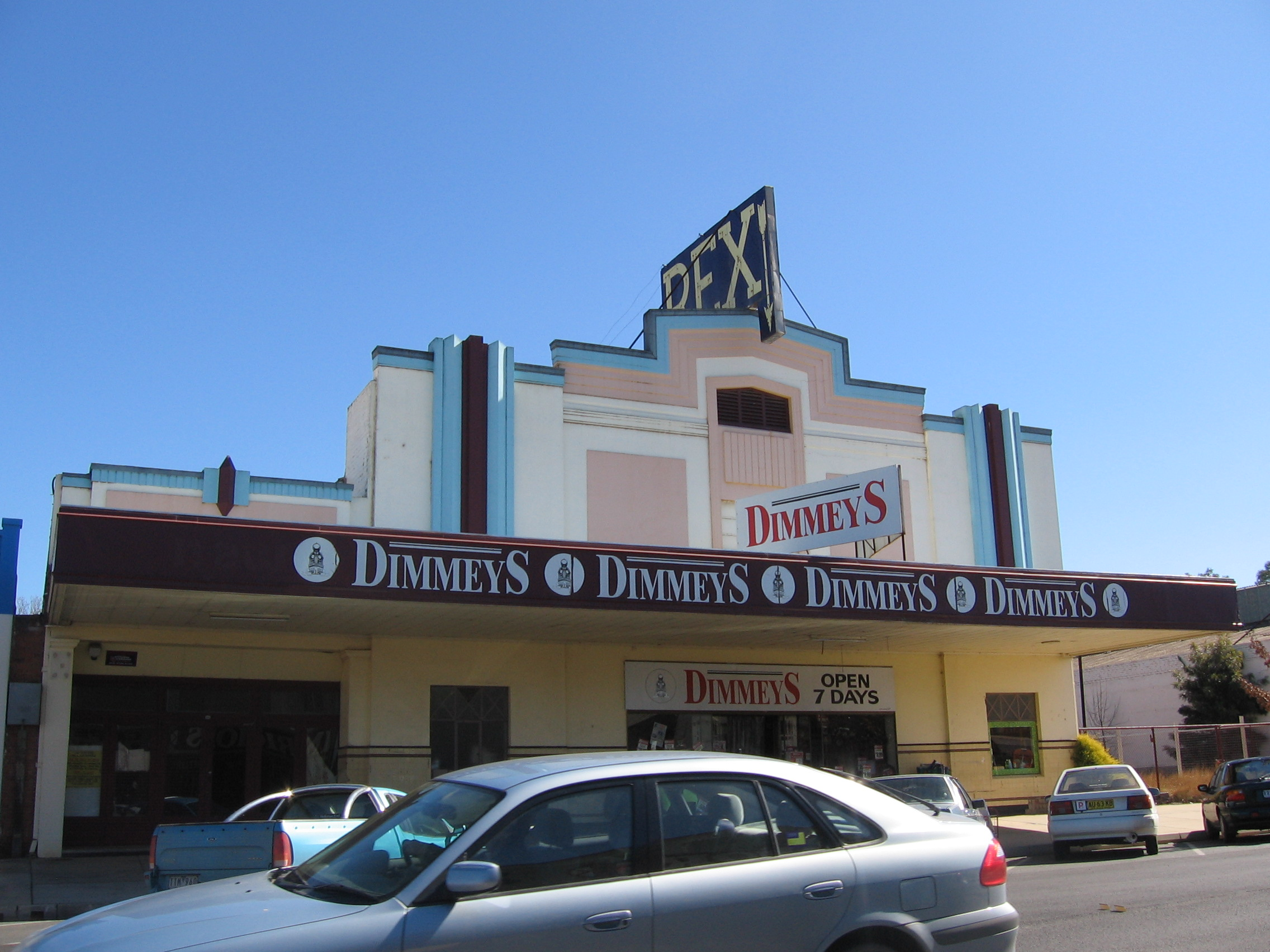
Dimmeys store in Corowa, New South Wales in 2008

Dimmeys announced on 19 November 2019 that it would be closing down, including all 31 stores and the online store, after 166 years of operation. This followed Cool Breeze Clothing, which had operated Dimmeys since the 2014 restructure, going into voluntary administration and appointing a liquidator.

In 2021, the company announced that it would seek to open branches across eastern Australia such as at Westfield Knox in Melbourne's eastern suburbs and Childers in Queensland.

== Current stores ==
As of March 2025, 18 Dimmeys discount department stores are operating, and the company website continues to list items for sale.

There are Dimmeys stores in four Australian states:

- New South Wales - 3 stores - Broken Hill, Corowa, and Lithgow
- Queensland - 2 stores - Bundaberg and Childers
- South Australia - 1 store - Mount Gambier
- Victoria - 12 stores - Box Hill, Coburg, Colac, Cowes, Dandenong, Gladstone Park, Mildura, Rosebud, Sale, Shepparton, Sunshine and Werribee (Richmond opening soon)

== Advertising ==
As noted above, the Dimmeys tower became an iconic landmark, and the company logo and other promotional material incorporated an image of the tower.

From the early 1990s, Dimmeys featured former AFL footballer Robert DiPierdomenico (nicknamed 'Dipper') in their television and radio advertising, spruiking the slogans: "Be there!" and "$9.99!".

== Swan Street store ==
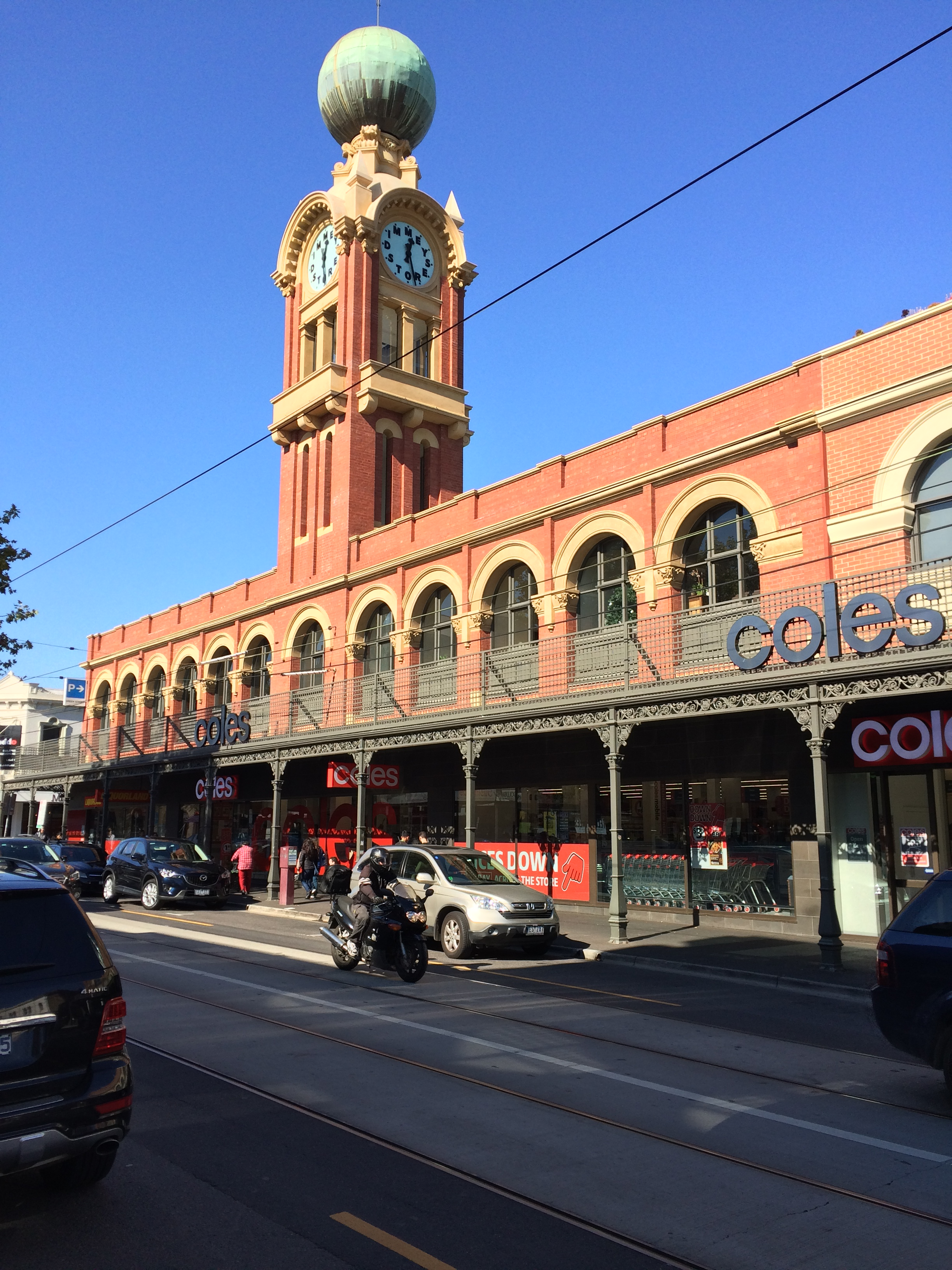
The Dimmeys clock tower after its restoration and redevelopment of the Swan Street building

The Swan Street premises is listed as having "architectural and historical significance to the state of Victoria" with Heritage Victoria.

In 1997, the Swan Street store's clock tower and globe was ranked first in The Age newspaper's 'Melbourne Icons' series. The clock tower was painted yellow and black in 1981 to mark the 350th AFL game of Richmond footballer Kevin Bartlett.

In 2004, the local artist Hayden Dewar was commissioned to paint a series of murals representing the history of the store and of Victoria since 1853 along the Green Street facade of the Swan Street store. The work stretches for 67 metres.

In 2008, the building was sold to developers Richmond Icon for around $16 million. The developers later announced plans to build a ten-storey residential building on the site, preserving the heritage listed clock-tower and frontage, but including the destruction of several metres of the mural. The original plan was contested by the council on a number of grounds, with the outcome that the mural was preserved.

The Dimmeys store closed in December 2012. The building was redeveloped with a Coles supermarket and a 10-storey apartment tower erected at the rear of the building. The clock tower was stripped back to its original brickwork and waterproofed.
