= Hooper's Store (Melbourne) =

Heritage-listed commercial building in Melbourne, Victoria, Australia

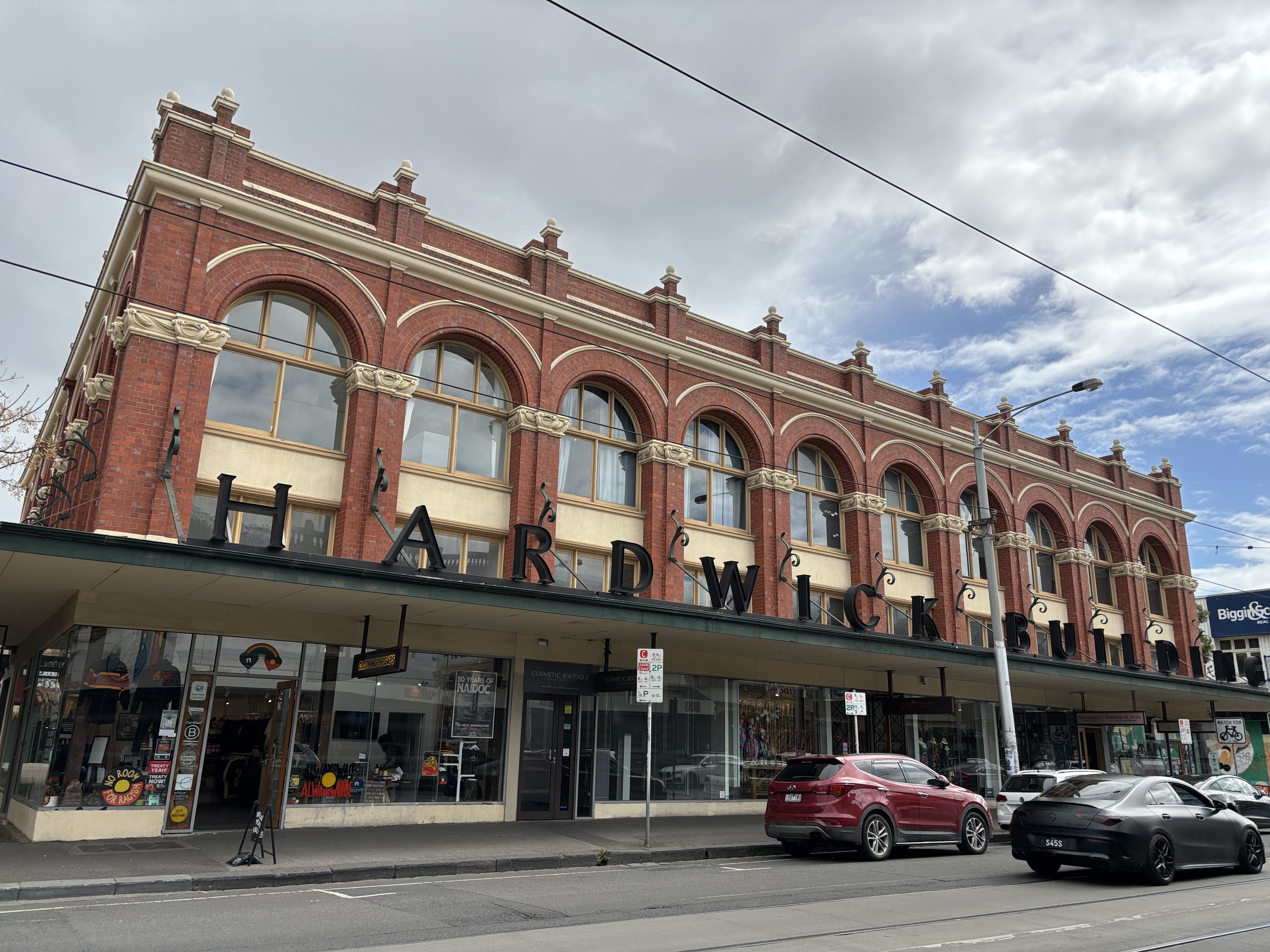
- The store in 2025, bearing the name "Hardwicks Building"

- Location within Melbourne
- Interactive map of the Hooper's Store area
- Alternative names: Hardwicks Building

General information
- Status: Completed
- Type: Retail drapery showroom (1908–1935); Various uses; Bridal emporium (since c. 2006)
- Architectural style: Romanesque Revival
- Location: Sydney Road, Brunswick, Melbourne, Victoria, Australia
- Coordinates: 37°45′58″S 144°57′43″E
- Current tenants: Mariana Hardwick; anor.
- Completed: 1908; 118 years ago
- Renovated: c. 2004 – c. 2006
- Client: J. H. Hooper & Company
- Owner: Mariana Hardwick (2004–2014)

Technical details
- Structural system: Structural steel frame
- Material: Steel; bricks; timber; glass
- Floor count: 2
- Floor area: c. 875 m^{2} (9,420 sq ft)

Design and construction
- Architecture firm: HW & FB Tompkins
- Main contractor: Robert McDonald

Renovating team
- Architect: Urban Workshop Architects
- Other designers: Breathe

Victorian Heritage Register
- Official name: Former Hoopers Store
- Type: Registered place
- Designated: 20 February 1997
- Reference no.: H1296
- Heritage overlay no.: HO161
- Category: Retail and Wholesale

The Hooper's Store, known as Hardwicks Building since c. 2006, is a commercial building located at 459–475 Sydney Road, Brunswick, an inner northern suburb of Melbourne, in Victoria, Australia. Built in 1908 for the J. H. Hooper & Company as a retail drapery store up until 1935, the building was subsequently repurposed as a bridal emporium.

The building was added to the Victorian Heritage Register on 20 February 1997 in recognition of its architectural and historical significance.

== History ==
Founded in Footscray in 1885 by John Henry Hooper, his brother, Edward T. Hooper, their father, Thomas Hooper, and later, their brother-in-law, John Robertson, J. H. Hooper & Company commenced business as drapers.

In March 1908, the company opened a new store and workshop in Sydney Road, Brunswick in order to capture the Melbourne trade. Hooper's occupied the building until 1935.

The Hooper family and John Robertson – the Hooper's business partner and brother-in-law – were well known Melbourne metropolitan drapers who helped to initiate the universal Saturday half-holiday, and wage boards for shop assistants and employees in the clothing trade. John Robertson was instrumental in the anti-sweating league.

Various discount stores leased the building including Waltons department stores and the Spotlight Group. Acquired by Mariana Hardwick in 2004, the building was renovated over the next two years as a bridal emporium, renames the Hardwicks Building, with leases for a range of related speciality stores. In 2014, Hardwick sold the 875-square-metre (9,420 sq ft) property for A$3.2 million, and leased back part of the building for an initial five years from July 2013, plus two seven-year options.

== Description ==
The two-storey American Romanesque Revival style structure was designed by HW & FB Tompkins and was built by Robert McDonald. The building featured a structural steel internal framework, an arcaded red-brick upper floor, a large wrap-around cantilever verandah and a frameless floor-to-ceiling glass shopfront.

A single-storey extension was made to the rear of the building in 1937, and the building was subsequently subdivided and altered internally. These alterations also included removal of the original internal timber staircase and installation of a new shopfront.

Hooper's store is an important early work of HW & FB Tompkins. The Tompkins brothers were the first local designers to specialise in the American Romanesque Revival style, which appeared in the 1890s and emerged as the dominant commercial style of architecture until about World War I. The Tompkin brothers became the leading architectural practice in warehouse and department store work and pioneered the use of multi-storey structural steel frame works for these buildings. They designed many such buildings in Melbourne, including the department stores of Sydney Myer.

Hooper's store is reputedly the first example of the "American style of steel construction" in Victoria, perhaps Australia — a concept conceived in Chicago in the late 1880s, and one which was pioneered and exploited locally by the Tompkins brothers during the first quarter of the twentieth century. It is also notable for its early use of a cantilevered or suspended street awning. Spacious cantilevered verandahs became the fashion by the 1920s, thus superseding the earlier more squat post-supported types. Hooper's Store is also important as an early example in Victoria of American Romanesque Revival style architecture — a style of simplicity and weighty robustness developed during the last half of the nineteenth century which reflected commercial and industrial wealth and power.

== See also ==
- List of places on the Victorian Heritage Register in the City of Merri-bek
