= HW & FB Tompkins =

Froemr architectural practice based in Melbourne, Victoria, Australia

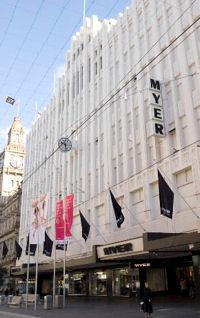
- Myer, Bourke Street facade; designed by the firm in the Inter-war Functionalist & Moderne style; completed in 1933

Practice information
- Firm type: Partnership
- Founders: Henry (Harry) William Tompkins; Frank Beauchamp Tompkins
- Founded: 1898
- Location: Melbourne, Victoria, Australia

Significant works and honors
- Design: Red-brick Romanesque Revival style; Steel-framed commercial buildings; Neoclassical Revival style

HW & FB Tompkins was an architectural firm established in 1898 by the brothers, Henry (Harry) William Tompkins (1865 – 1959) and Frank Beauchamp Tompkins (c. 1867 – 1952), based in Melbourne, Victoria, Australia. They went on to become a major commercial firm, designing a large number of department stores, hotels, clubs and office buildings and banks over the next forty years, many in central Melbourne and most extant. They were stylistic and structural innovators, and are best known for the Myer department store on Melbourne's Bourke Street, built in many stages in different styles from 1914 to 1933.

== Early life ==
The Tompkins brothers were born in England, and grew up in South Africa, before arriving with their parents in Melbourne in 1886. The city at the time was in the throes of a boom, which became a bust in the early 1890s. Harry became an assistant to architect Richard Speight and formed a partnership with Speight briefly in the mid-1890s, until 1896 when he took up a position with the Public Works Department in Western Australia. Frank meanwhile worked in a number of architectural offices, including with Nahum Barnet. After being retrenched in 1898, Harry returned to Melbourne, and formed a partnership with Frank.

== Architectural careers ==
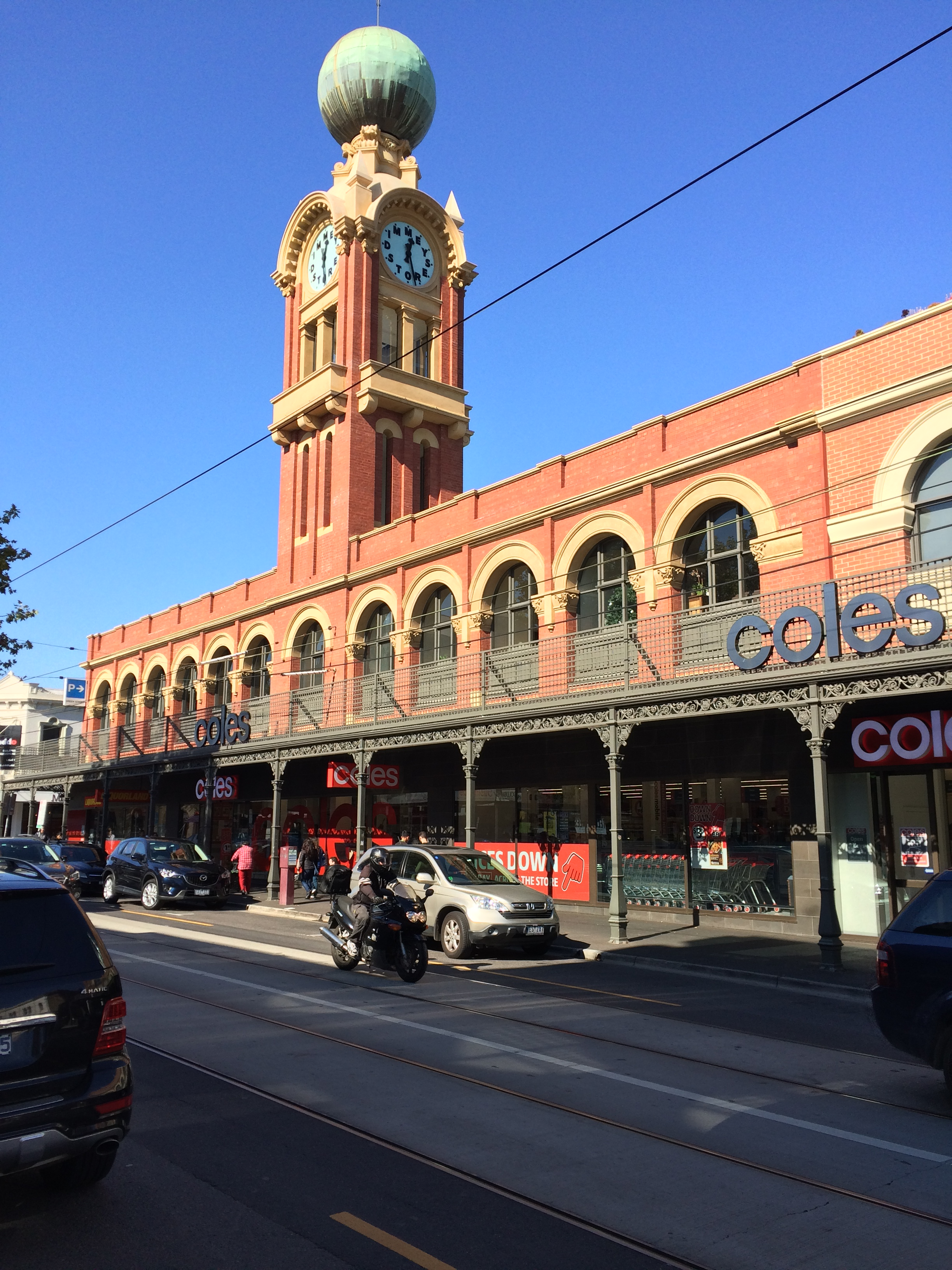
Dimmeys Store

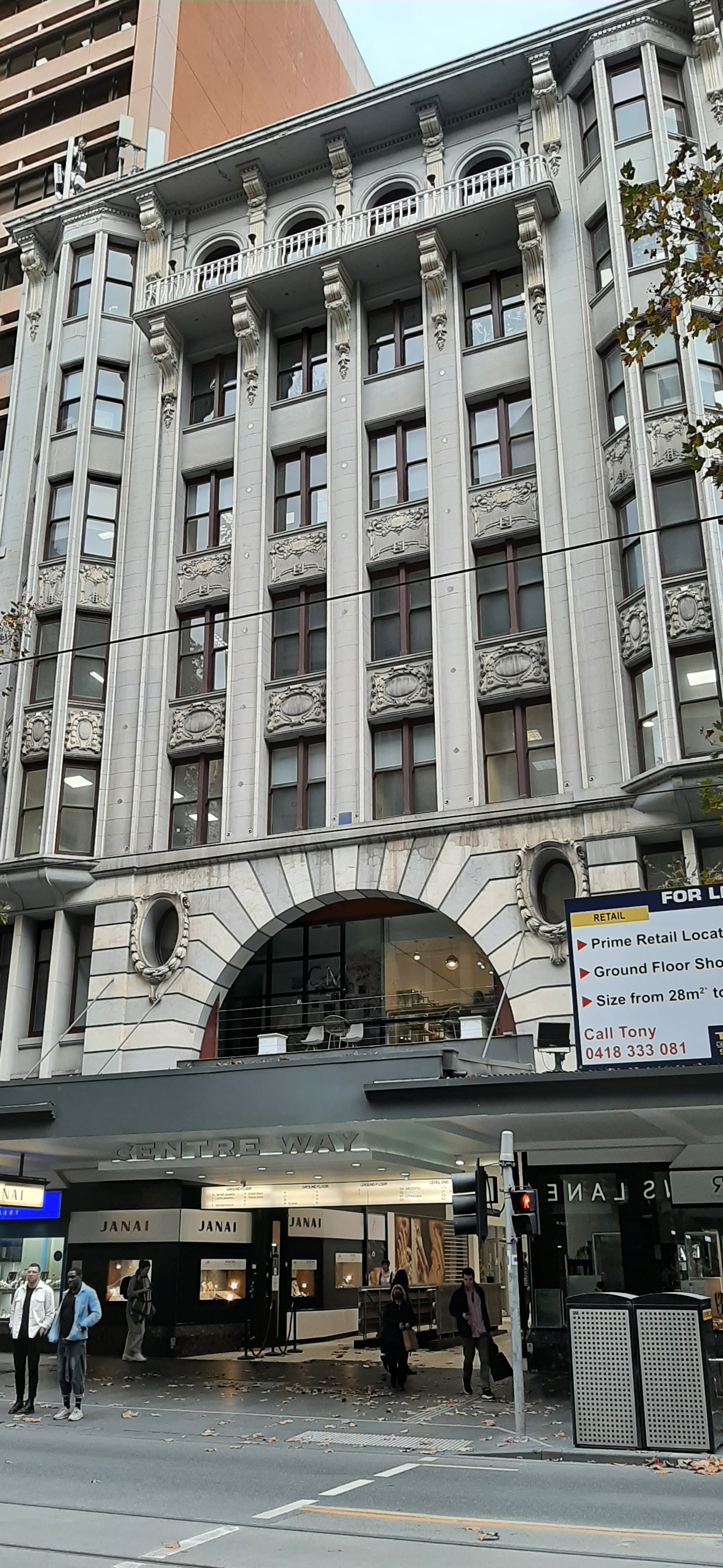
Centre Way building

The brothers were immediately successful, winning a competition for clubrooms for the Commercial Travellers Association in 1898, built at 170 Flinders Street the following year. (Note: Though only Harry's name was given as the architect.) It was in the red-brick Romanesque Revival style with many Queen Anne Revival elements), a style which emerged in Melbourne at that time, and came to dominate commercial architecture in the central city, especially warehouses, over the next ten years.

This project was followed by the Metcalfe & Barnard warehouse on the corner of Flinders Lane and Russell Street in a similar style in 1902, and in 1908 this was followed by another Flinders Lane warehouse for Borsdorff & Co. (a renovation of an earlier building), also in red-brick Romanesque Revival style, this time with exotic horseshoe arches. They used the red-brick Romanesque Revival for two small suburban department stores, Dimmeys in Richmond in 1907, expanded in 1918 with an elaborate clock tower, and Hooper's Store in Brunswick in 1908. They also designed a number of churches and country pubs in this period.

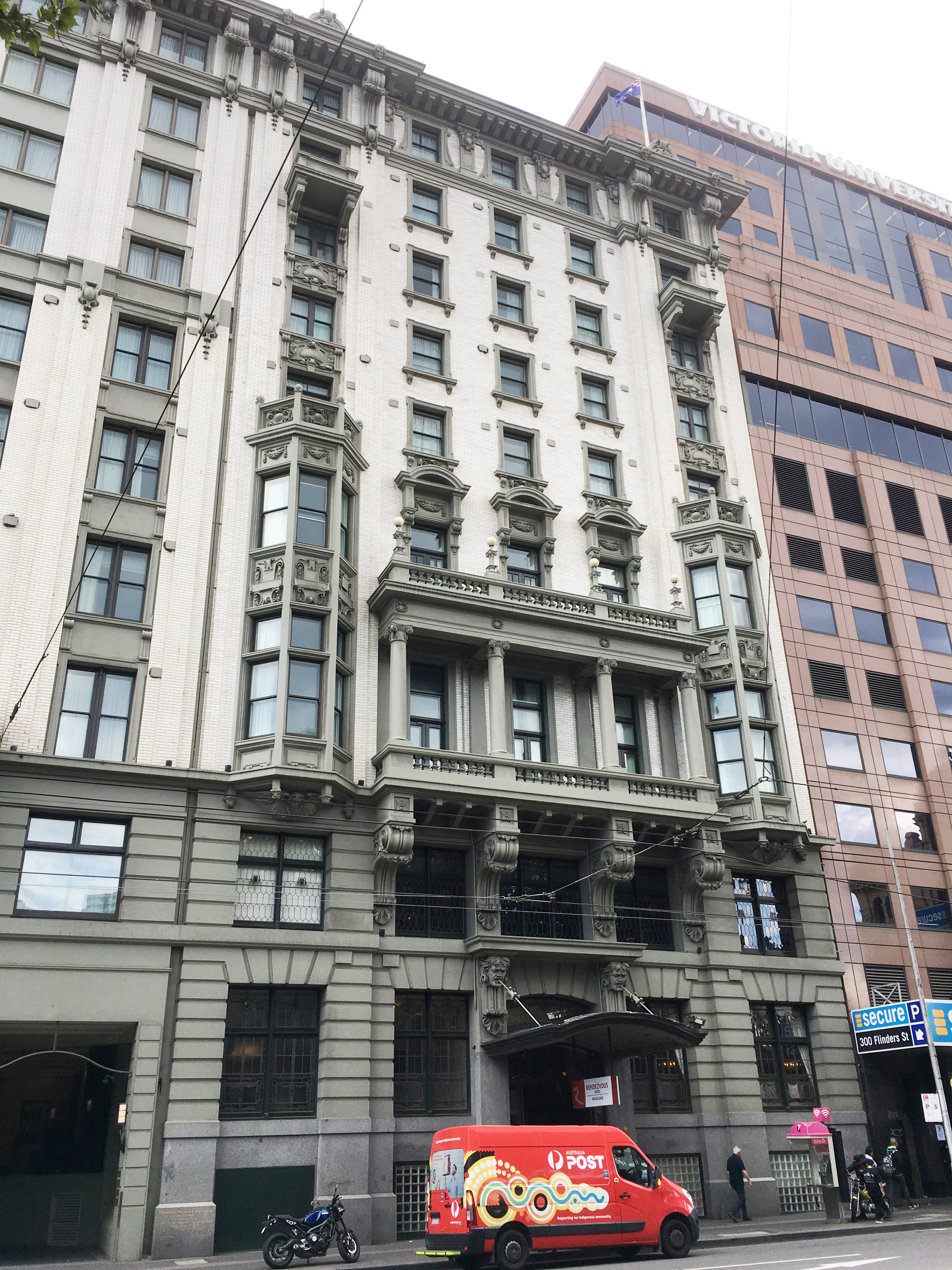
Commercial Travellers Hotel, 1913

From about this time and into the 1940s both Frank and Harry made frequent study trips abroad, bringing back the latest in innovations for various buildings types, new architectural approaches and new construction techniques. Harry's first trip was a tour of Europe and United States in 1910, and he returned "full of enthusiasm for all things American", which emerged in their next projects.

The Centre Way building and arcade in Collins Street, completed 1911, was an early example of a fully steel-framed structure in Melbourne. Having already extended their premises upwards twice, by 1913 the Commercial Travellers Association had grown to such an extent that they moved into new clubrooms in Flinders Street two blocks from the first in the form of a large hotel with extensive facilities for their members, such as a large billiard room and dining room, and an adjacent investment office building, and these also used a steel frame. For both projects they abandoned the Romanesque for a simpler approach, combined with the exaggerated classical details of the English Baroque Revival. The CTA hotel and office building were influenced by the American 'palazzo' style, with elaborate lower floors and cornice, and plain walls between, clad in white glazed brick, and the interior features an impressive circular lobby and elaborate plasterwork.

In 1912, Harry met Sidney Myer, who had just purchased a drapery store in Bourke Street in order to expand his Bendigo drapery business into Melbourne. Together, they toured the United States looking at department stores. The resulting seven-storey building completed in 1914 in Bourke Street adopted a similar form to the Centre Way and CTA buildings, albeit with arches on the penultimate floor. It was reportedly inspired by the 1908 Emporium in San Francisco, though perhaps this was mainly the name and perhaps the operation, since the architectural style is quite different. The Tompkins brother were the architects for the expansion of Myer over the next twenty years.

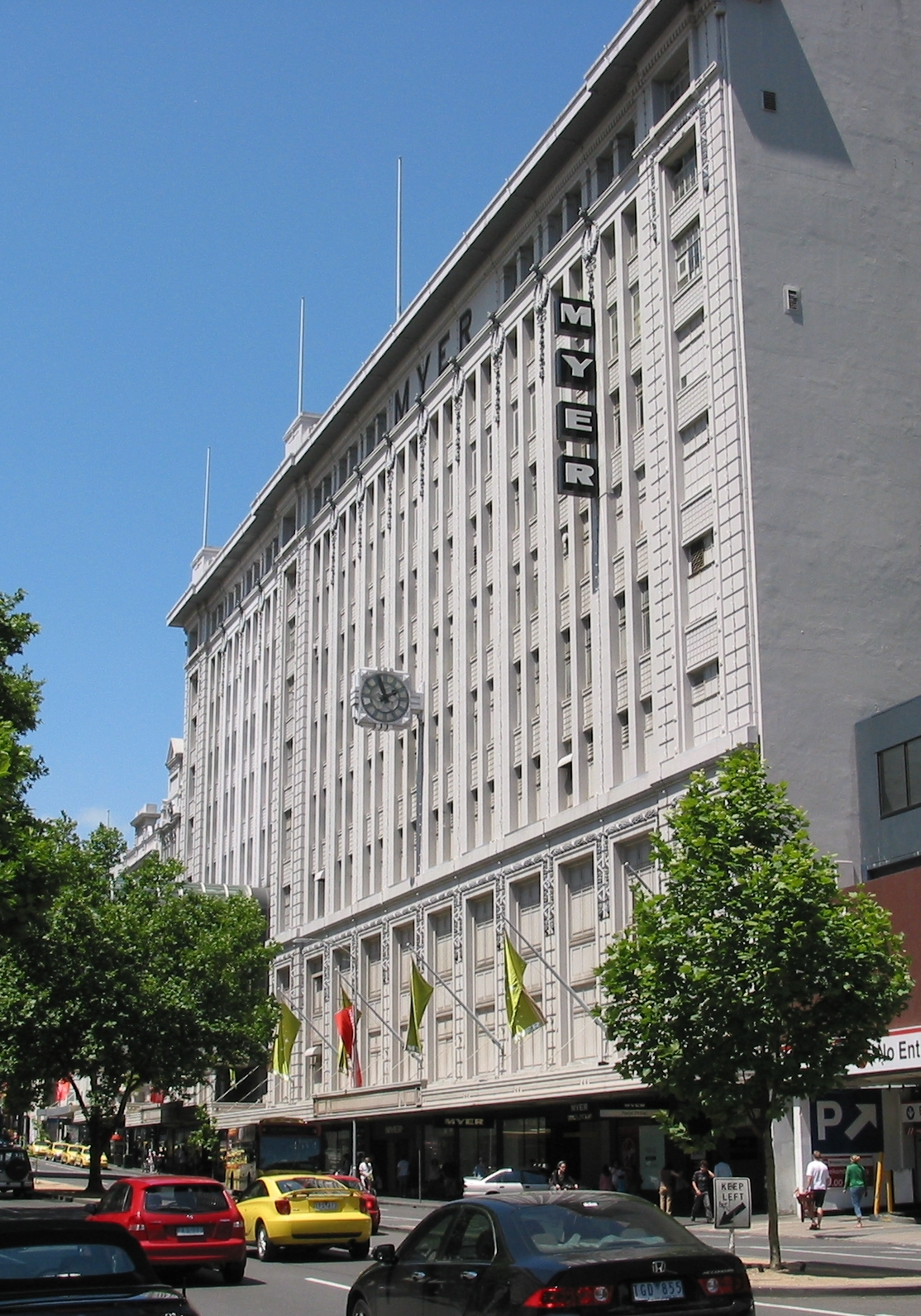
Myer, Lonsdale Street frontage

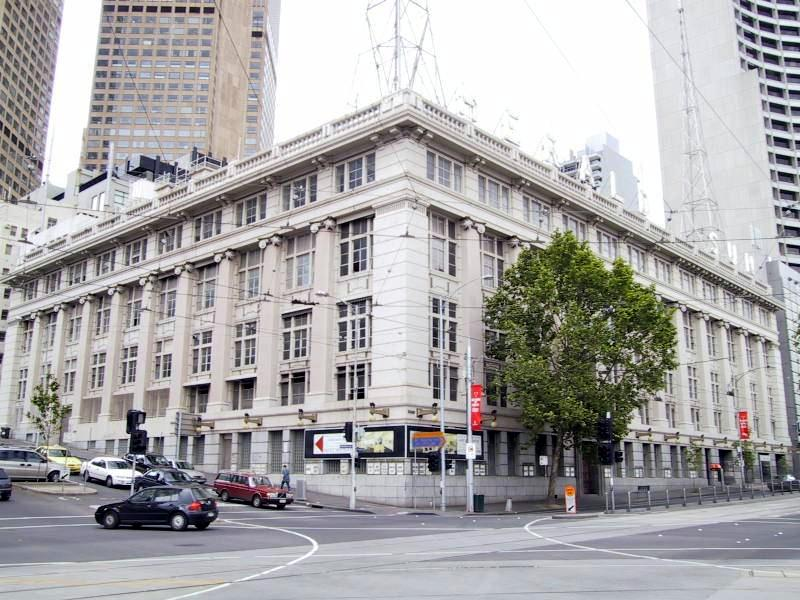
Herald Building

In 1914, the Tompkins brothers completed another department store, for Treadways in Chapel Street, Prahran, which had become a major shopping strip with many department stores. Called the Colossuem, the design was clearly inspired by Selfridges in Oxford Street in London, completed a few years before, a commercial version of Neoclassical Revival architecture, featuring giant order columns, and a large cornice. This was the first example of the Neoclassical Revival that came to dominate Melbourne commercial architecture in the 1920s. Following the hiatus of World War I, their next most prominent project was the Herald and Weekly Times Building, Flinders Street, in a stripped back version of Neoclassical Revivalism, with tall Ionic pilasters. The first stage was completed in 1921, with a doubling in size in 1928. Other important designs in this mode include the Bank of Australasia, corner of Russell Street and Flinders Lane (1923), Myer Lonsdale Street expansion (1926), and the National Bank chambers in Geelong (1928). In this period they also designed some Gothic Revival-style churches, and some private homes.

In the early 1930s, like most architects, they adopted the new Inter-war Functionalist & Moderne style, most notable in their design for a new enlarged Bourke Street wing of Myer, completed in 1933. Finished in white 'snowcrete', the vertical ribbing and tower-like projection made it a landmark, and the Myer Mural Hall in the central top projection is one of the grandest Art Deco interiors in Melbourne. This was followed by some other Art Deco commercial buildings, such as Diamond House, directly opposite Myer, for Dunklings jewellers, in 1936, and a showroom and warehouse for Australian Glass Manufacturers in Spencer Street, West Melbourne in 1937 that featured glass blocks extensively, but their output in the later 1930s waned, as both brothers entered their sixties.

Their prodigious output up to then, much of which remains, especially in the central city, has left of wealth of buildings. This includes remarkably a cluster of three, in three different styles, adjacent to each other on the corner of Russell Street and Flinders Lane - on the south east corner is the Metcalfe & Barnard Warehouse (1902) in the Romanesque Revival style, with Pawson House (1935) adjacent on Flinders Lane in the Art Deco style, and the Bank of Australasia (1923) on the north east corner in the Neo-classical Revival style.

The firm continued through World War II, becoming Tompkins Shaw & Evans in the 1950s, who continued their association with Myer, designing a notable glass-walled footbridge joining the two parts of the store across Little Bourke Street in 1963.

In 2003 the firm became Tompkins MDA group; merging with the Sydney-based Michael Davies and Associates. As of 2026, the firm appeared no longer extant.

== Personal lives ==
Harry married in 1897, and was active in the profession. He joined the Royal Victorian Institute of Architects in 1903, served as president in 1914–1916; and served as national president of the Architects Institute of Australia from 1918 to 1919. Harry lived in Kew and was active in local affairs and served as Mayor from 1918 to 1919. He submitted a design for the Kew War Memorial at Kew Junction, in the form of a classical rotunda, that was completed in 1925 when he was no longer on Council, and they had rejected the results of a competition.

== List of major works ==
This is a list of major works that were completed by HW & FB Tompkins and associated subsequent entities:

As HW & FB Tompkins

- 1899: Commercial Travellers Association clubrooms, Flinders Street. (one floor added 1906, another in 1905, only facade survives)
- 1902: Metcalfe & Barnard warehouse, 145 - 149 Flinders Lane, se corner of Russell Street
- 1904: St Andrews, Maffra,
- 1904: St Andrew's, Sunbury
- 1907: Lane Centre, Flinders Lane
- 1908: Borsdorff & Co warehouse (now Tomasetti House), Flinders Lane
- 1907+1918: Dimmey's Store, Swan Street, Richmond
- 1908: Hooper's Store, Sydney Road, Brunswick, repurposed as the Hardwicks Building
- 1909: Paynes Bon Marche, Bourke Street (demolished)
- 1910: 'Danby', residence for Henry Buck (of Henry Buck's menswear), Rockley Road, South Yarra
- 1910: West Hawthorn Presbyterian Church (now Uniting), Power Street, Hawthorn
- 1912: Centre Way Arcade and building, Collins Street
- 1913: Commercial Travellers Association Hotel and offices, Flinders Street
- 1913: Melbourne Steamship Company, 27-31 King Street
- 1914: The Canterbury (apartments), Canterbury Road, St Kilda (another floor was added in 1919)
- 1914: Denyers Building, 264 Swanston Street
- 1914: Colosseum Department Store, Chapel Street, Prahran
- 1915: St Johns, Glenhuntly Road, Elsternwick
- 1915: National Australia Bank, Glenhuntly Road, Elsternwick
- 1921-1928: Herald and Weekly Times Building, Flinders Street
- 1923: Bank of Australasia, ne corner of Russell Street and Flinders Lane
- 1924: Yorkshire House, 20 Queen Street.
- 1925: London Stores, Bourke Street
- 1925: Kew War Memorial, Kew Junction
- 1926: Myer, Lonsdale Street expansion (only facades survive)
- 1926: St Davids Methodist (now Uniting), 902A Burke Road, Canterbury
- 1927: St Johns, Mt Alexander Road, Essendon
- 1928: National Bank chambers and offices, Malop Street, Geelong
- 1928: 'Yarrowee', Rosehill Road, Lower Plenty
- 1928: Myer Despatch, Queensberry Street, Carlton
- 1933: Myer Bourke Street (enlarged frontage)
- 1933: Mantons store, Bourke Street (later enlarged as a Coles Store, facade now covered over)
- 1935: Pawson House, 141 Flinders Lane
- 1936: Diamond House, Bourke Street (only facade survives)
- 1936: Myer Despatch (second building), Berkeley Street, Carlton
- 1937: Australian Glass Manufacturers, Spencer Street, West Melbourne (only facade survives)
- 1937: Mantons Department Store, Bourke Street (facade now hidden by later cladding)

As Tompkins Shaw & Evans

- 1963: Aerial walkway, joining the Myer buildings (demolished in 2010 and rebuilt in modified form)
- 1968: Ponsford Stand, MCG

== See also ==
- Architecture of Melbourne
- Australian non-residential architectural styles
