= Capitol Hill School =

- U.S. National Register of Historic Places
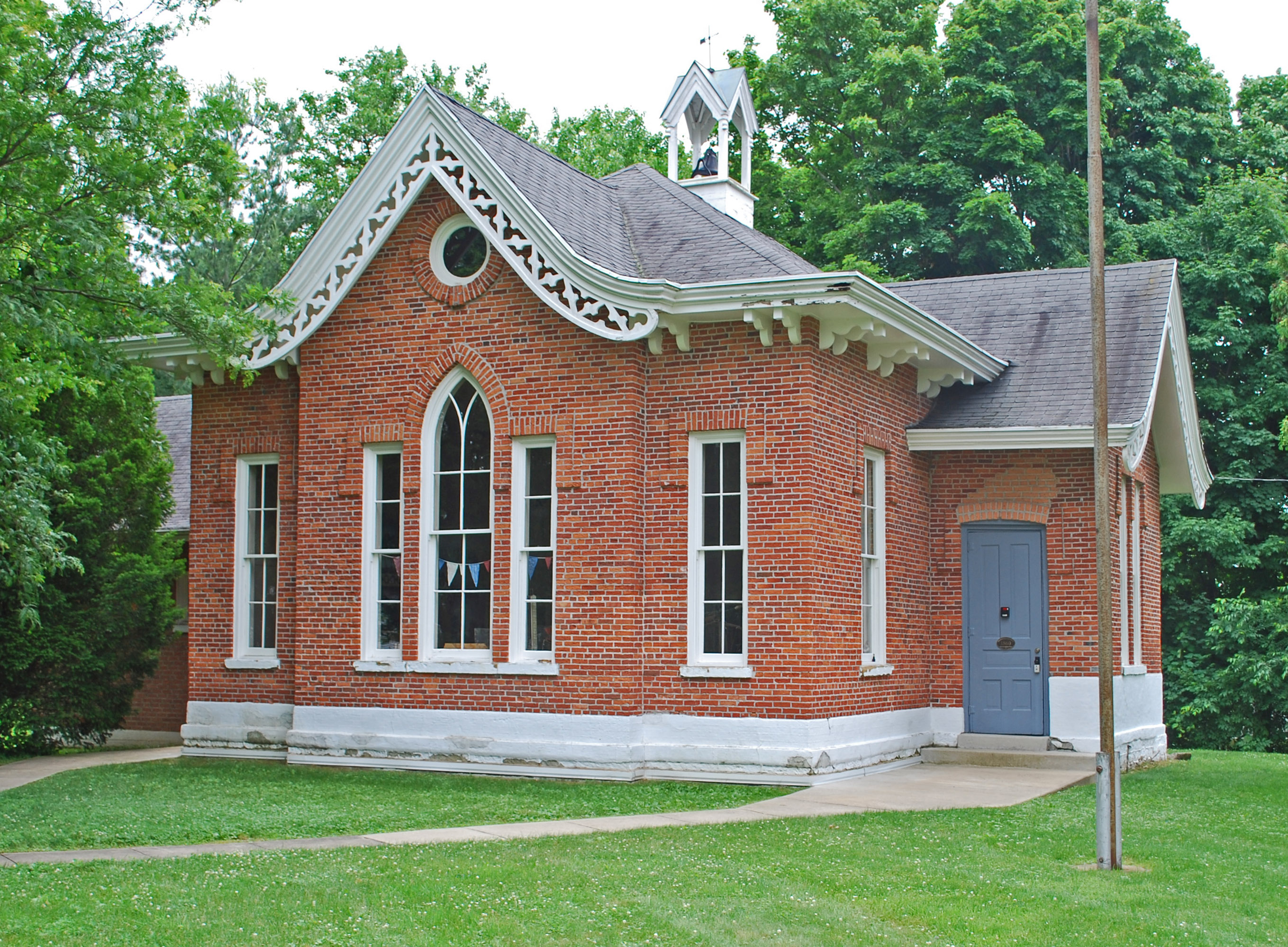
- Interactive map
- Location: 603 Washington St., Marshall, Michigan
- Coordinates: 42°15′52″N 84°57′7″W
- Area: less than one acre
- Built: 1860
- Built by: E.O. Crittenton
- Architect: Sheldon Smith
- Architectural style: Gothic Revival
- NRHP reference No.: 72000598
- Added to NRHP: March 16, 1972

The Capitol Hill School is a former school building located at 603 Washington Street in Marshall, Michigan. It was listed on the National Register of Historic Places in 1972. It is currently used as a museum.

== History ==
Soon after Michigan became a state, Marshall bid on becoming the state capitol. To that end, the town set aside a sizable town square as the future site of the capitol building, designating it "Capitol Hill." However, in 1847, Lansing, Michigan was chosen as the site of the new capitol, dashing Marshall's hopes. In 1860, when Marshall constructed three new primary schools, the vacant Capitol Hill site was selected as the location of the Fourth Ward School. Sheldon Smith served as architect for the three schools and E. O. Crittenton supervised their construction. The building was used as a school until 1961, when it closed. The city gave the building to the Marshall Historical Society in 1968. It was restored by the Society, and is used as a museum.

== Description ==
The Capitol Hill School is a two-room, one-story brick Gothic Revival primary school. It sits on a sandstone foundation with a brick drip mould. The main section of the building measures 42 feet by 27 feet, shaped in a cruciform plan. The central portion of the cruciform is covered with a hip roof, and the four legs are covered with gabled projecting bays. The gables are decorated with tracery verge boards, and an ornamental circular window in the gable end. Brackets support the remaining eaves. The building has tall rectangular windows; the ones in the bay ends have Gothic arches.
