= Eugene P. Robertson House =

- U.S. National Register of Historic Places
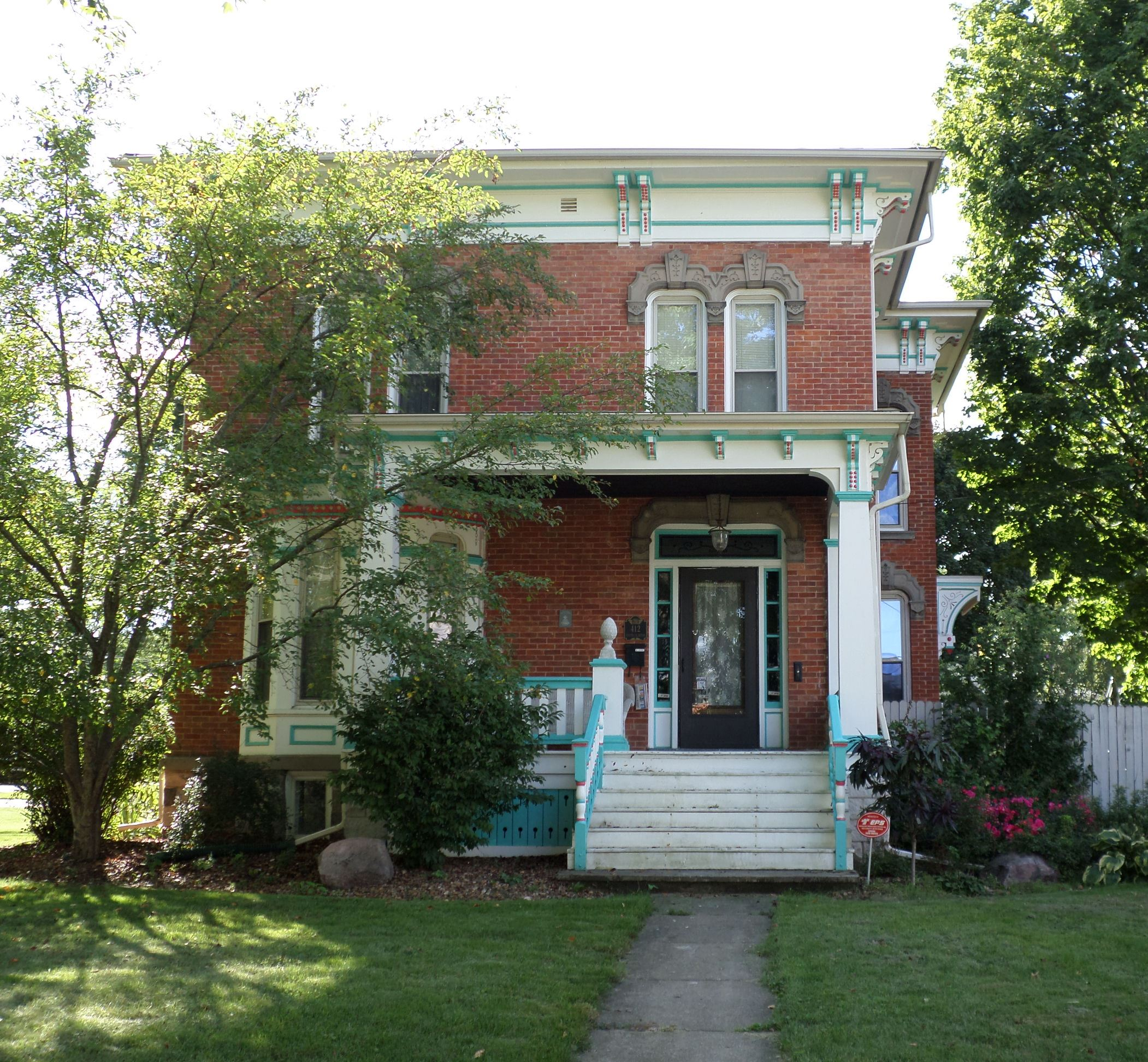
- Interactive map
- Location: 412 S. Clinton St., Albion, Michigan
- Coordinates: 42°14′32″N 84°45′17″W
- Area: 0.3 acres (0.12 ha)
- Built: c. 1975
- Architectural style: Italianate
- NRHP reference No.: 88000028
- Added to NRHP: February 8, 1988

The Eugene P. Robertson House is a single-family home located at 412 South Clinton Street in Albion, Michigan. It was listed on the National Register of Historic Places in 1988.

== History ==
Eugene P. Robertson was born in Albion in 1841. Robertson began working Mayhew & Irwin, a local private banking firm, in 1863. By 1877, he was cashier of the Albion Exchange Bank owned by J. W. Sheldon. About the same time, likely in 1875, Robertson built this house for his family. He went on to serve as the mayor of the City of Albion in 1890. In 1891 and 1892 he served as treasurer of the Michigan Bankers Association, and was elected treasurer of Albion College. In 1894, bank owner J. W. Sheldon died In 1895 Robertson established the Albion State Bank where he served as president of until at least 1913. Robertson lived in the house until his death in 1916, and the house remained in the family until the death of his widow, Carrie L. Robertson in 1923. It was later turned into apartments.

== Description ==
The Eugene P. Robertson House is a two-story, red brick Italianate structure with a T-shaped main section and a slightly lower rear addition. The house originally had a small Italianate front porch and double entry doors. Around 1900 these were replaced with a broad bracketed veranda supported by square wood posts on a cement block base, and a single front door with sidelights. The windows have highly ornamental carved stone caps with keystones and corbels and incised detailing. Two bay windows have paneled aprons, round-corner windows, and bracketed cornices. The house has a low pitch hip roof with paneled soffit windows and paired-bracket cornice supports.
