= Queen Anne Revival architecture =

Queen Anne Revival architecture may mean:

- British Queen Anne Revival architecture, found in Britain from the 1870s, with a mix of English, Flemish and other house styles, influenced by the Arts and Crafts movement
- Queen Anne architecture in the United States, where what is termed "Queen Anne" is technically a revival style
- New World Queen Anne Revival architecture, found elsewhere in North America, and in South America and Australia from the 1890s, with "free Renaissance" styles in contrast to Gothic Revival architecture
