= Emporia, Florida =

Emporia
- Unincorporated community
- Location within Volusia County
- Coordinates: 29°12′06″N 81°28′05″W
- Country: United States
- State: Florida
- County: Volusia
- Elevation: 46 ft (14 m)
- Time zone: UTC-5 (Eastern (EST))
  - Summer (DST): UTC-4 (EDT)
- enter ZIP code: 32180
- Area code: 386
- GNIS feature ID: 282210

Emporia is an unincorporated community located in northwest Volusia County, Florida, United States, located along Emporia Road between Pierson and Barberville. The community is primarily agricultural.
