= The Emporium, Leicestershire =

Nightclub in Leicestershire, England

Coordinates: 52.7234°N 1.3741°W

The Emporium is a club located in Coalville, Leicestershire established under that name in 1995.

Passion was launched in 1995 by the then club owners Mark Walsh and Eric Schofield, when the club was known as Crystals. Chris Hall, a London promoter who had helped set up Club UK, suggested changing the name to the Emporium and starting a dance night called ‘Passion’: he booked Todd Terry to headline the first ever event. JFK played the first ever record at Passion: the night ran from 9pm-2am, initially in one room, with a sound system being hired as the club's own system could not take the music. Around 700 people turned up on the first night and Passion was born.

In 2004, JFK, who had been resident DJ, gave up his residency to further his DJ career elsewhere, although he continued to DJ there. In 2006 he returned after almost 2 years away from the club, becoming involved with the promotion and running of the club once again.

In January 2012 Passion ran a classics night playing trance music, which was almost a sell out. The DJ line up was made up of names from past and present that have played a part in its history: A mixture of old and new residents along with cutting edge new talent.

Room 2 saw the return of Red Room Sessions and its famous residents Nick Correlli (MYNC Project) and DJ Canete.
