= Oakhill (Marshall, Michigan) =

- U.S. National Register of Historic Places
- U.S. National Historic Landmark District – Contributing property
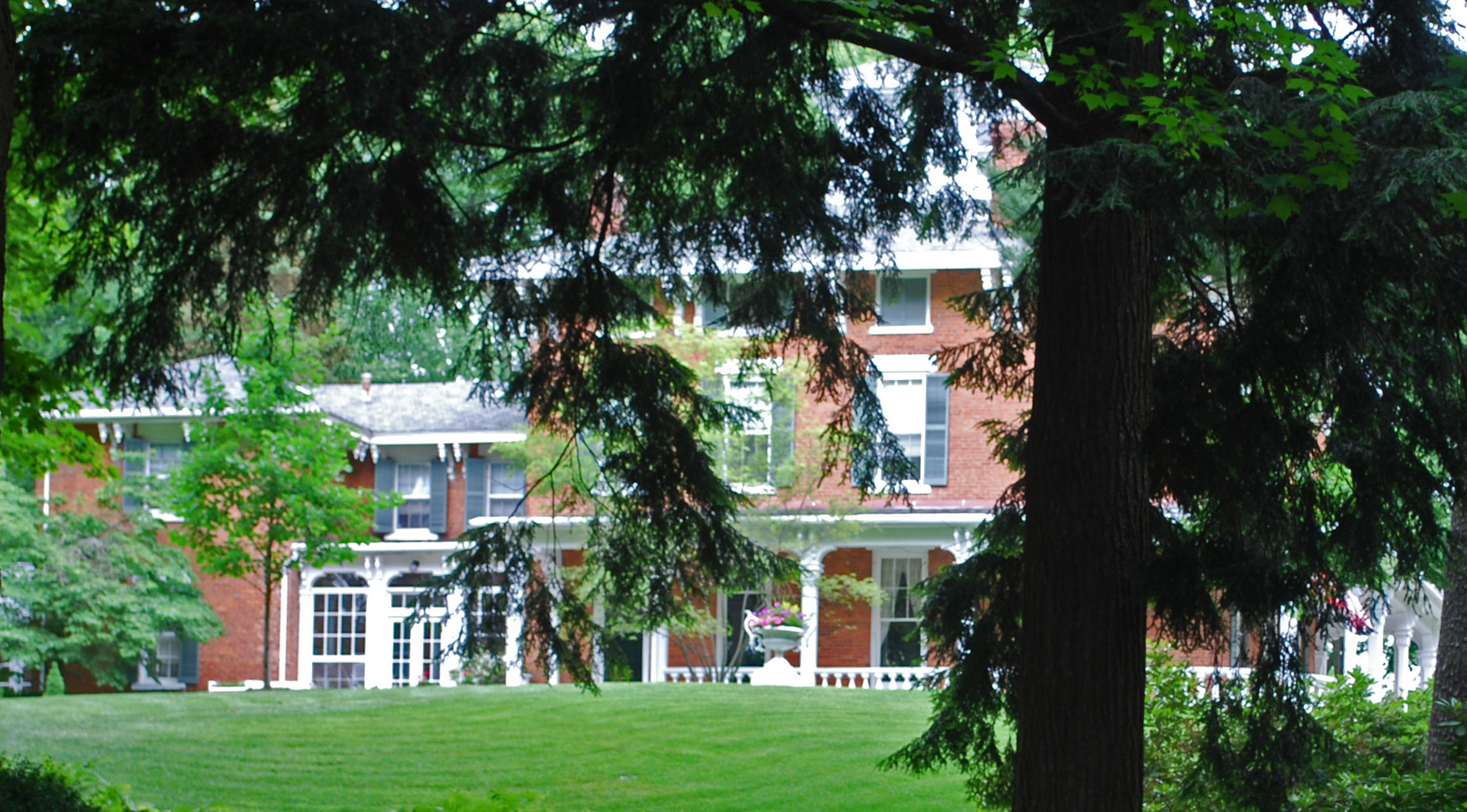
- Interactive map
- Location: 410 N. Eagle St., Marshall, Michigan
- Coordinates: 42°16′38″N 84°57′42″W
- Area: 5 acres (2.0 ha)
- Built: 1859
- Architectural style: Italian Villa
- Part of: Marshall Michigan Historic Landmark District (ID91002053)
- NRHP reference No.: 74000981
- Added to NRHP: December 31, 1974

Oakhill, also known as the Chauncey M. Brewer House, is a single-family home located at 410 North Eagle Street in Marshall, Michigan. It was listed on the National Register of Historic Places in 1974.

== History ==
Chauncey M. Brewer was born in Oneonta, New York in 1814. He worked in a country store until 1835, when he and boyhood friend Charles T. Gorham moved to Clinton, Michigan. In 1836, the two moved to Marshall and opened a general store.

The store prospered, and in 1838 they a new brick store in the town constructed of brick. In 1840, Gorham moved on to banking, while Brewer remained in the dry goods business.

In 1859, Brewer constructed a new home, farming the adjacent acreage. He lived here until his death in 1889. The house continued to be used. as a private residence, but was abandoned after about 1950. In 1968, a new owner began extensive restoration, which continued into the 1970s.

== Description ==
Oakhill is a two-and-one-half story red brick Italianate residence. It has a squared central mass with a truncated hip roof, and a two story rectangular extension attached to one side.

The roof overhang is supported by decorative double cornice brackets. A square cupola with arched windows is located in the center of the roof. The attic story contains half-windows framed between the cornice brackets, while the windows on the first two stories are double-hung sash units with white stone lintels. A wide veranda supported by columns runs around the front and side of the house.
