= William Prindle Livery Stable =

- U.S. National Register of Historic Places
- U.S. National Historic Landmark District – Contributing property
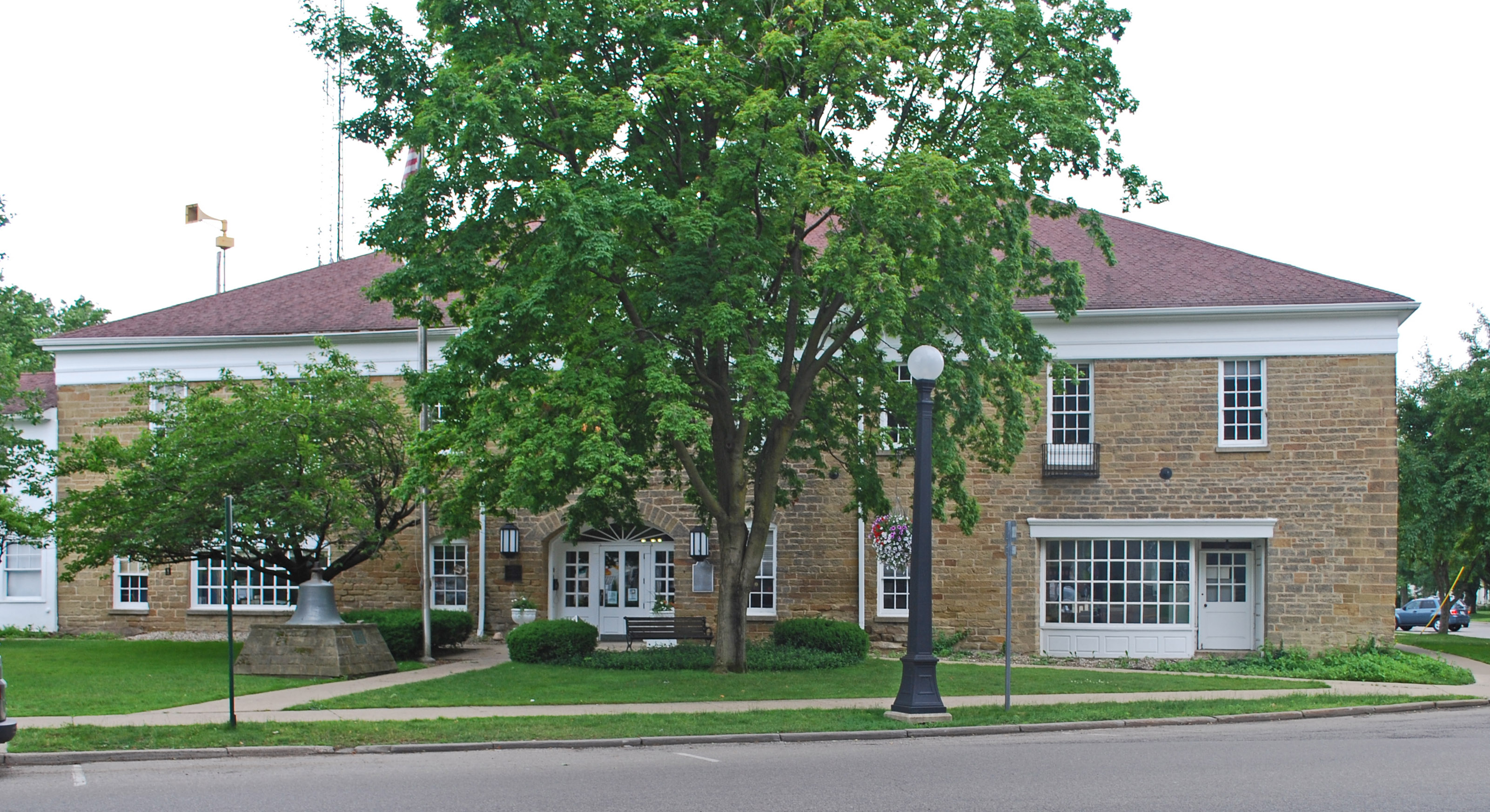
- Interactive map
- Location: 323 W. Michigan Ave., Marshall, Michigan
- Coordinates: 42°16′17″N 84°57′50″W
- Area: 0.4 acres (0.16 ha)
- Built: 1857
- Built by: William Prindle
- Architect: Howard F. Young
- Architectural style: Colonial Revival, Classical Revival
- Part of: Marshall Michigan Historic Landmark District (ID91002053)
- NRHP reference No.: 82002829
- Added to NRHP: August 19, 1982

The William Prindle Livery Stable is a farmer stable located at 323 West Michigan Avenue in Marshall, Michigan. It was listed on the National Register of Historic Places in 1982. It currently serves as the city hall for Marshall.

== History ==
In 1857, William Prindle began construction on a building to serve as a stagecoach stop and livery stable. For the next sixty years, it housed businesses related to transportation. The ground floor was home to a livery stable with a series of owners, while the upstairs was home to and carriage and wagon-building and painting shops. IN about 1890, a frame wong was moved from a lot across the alley and attache to the original building. By the 1920s, there was also "auto livery" available, and by the late 1920s the entire building housed an auto garage and service station. In 1929, Marshall's resident historic booster, Harold C. Brooks, proposed converting the building into Marshall's town hall as a way of conserving the historic integrity of the former stable. Brooks hired architect Howard F. Young to oversee the conversion, and the new town hall opened in 1930.

== History ==
The William Prindle Livery Stable is a two-story, hip-roof structure with walls made of yellow sandstone, coursed in the front and rubble on the sides. The original front facade was broad and utilitarian, with segmental-arch wagon entranceways located in the center and on one end, and an office area with a wide storefront on the other end. Windows on the second floor were square-head double-hung units with six-pane sashes. On one side, a flank-gable, two-story frame wing is attached. In 1929-30, the building was refurbished with additional architectural elements to transform it into the town hall. the former livery stable was transformed into the Marshall Town Hall. All the existing openings in the front facade were retained, with the broad storefront opening slightly reduced in size and the windows replaced with nine-over-six or nine-over-nine double-hung units. The wagon entrances were fitted with doors and re-purposed as entrances: the central on to the town hall proper and the end on providing access to a fire station. Elements added during the remodeling included a broad entablature, classical cornice, and a central pediment with fanlight, as well as a square tower on the roof topped with an octagonal, domed cupola. When the fire department discontinued use of the building, the former fire entrance was refitted with double doors.
