= Isaac Lockwood House =

- U.S. National Register of Historic Places
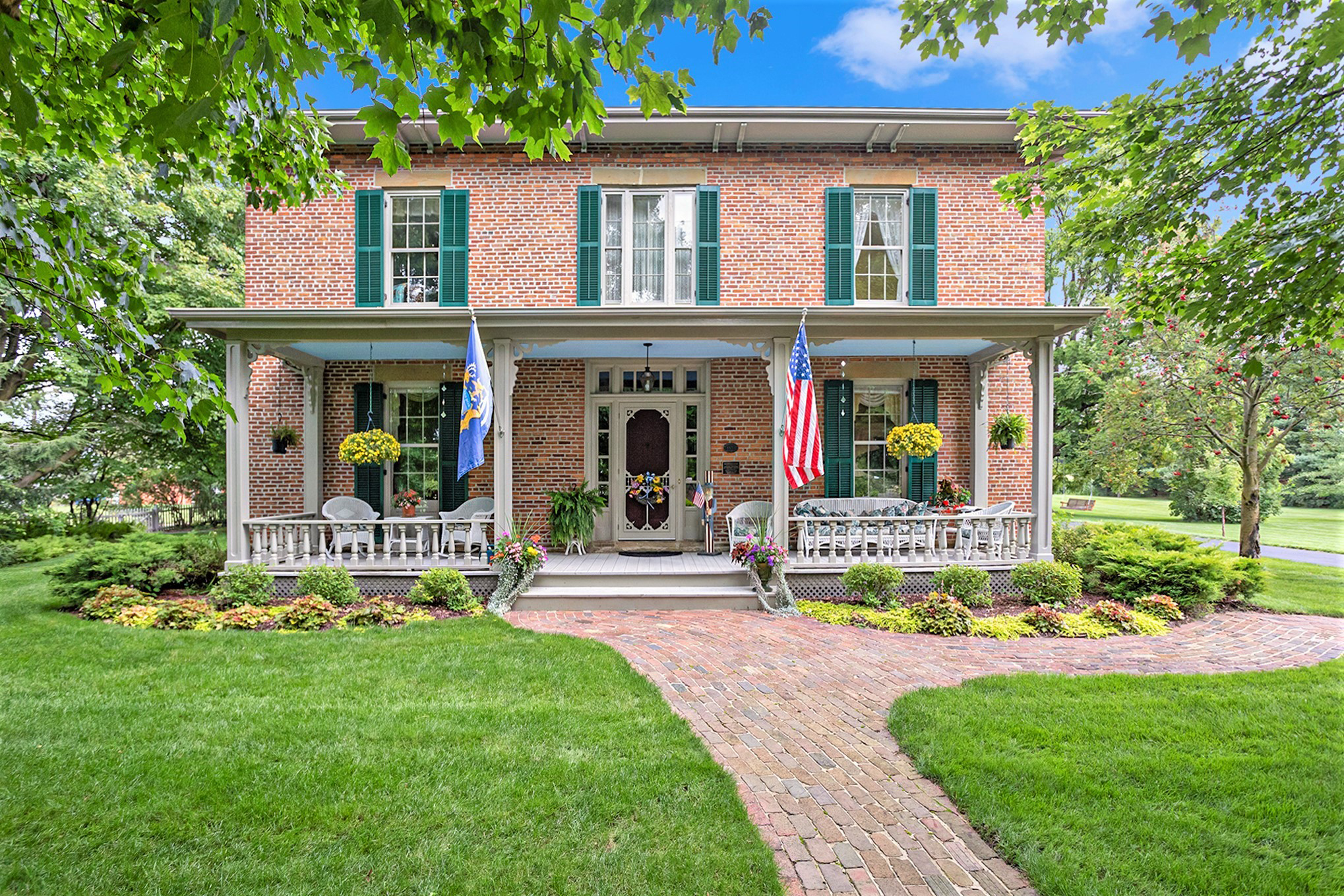
- Interactive map
- Location: 14011 Verona Rd., Marshall Township, Marshall, Michigan
- Coordinates: 42°17′32″N 85°01′23″W
- Area: 26 acres (11 ha)
- Built: 1853
- Built by: William L. Buck
- Architectural style: Italian Villa, gambrel-roof barn
- NRHP reference No.: 94000748
- Added to NRHP: July 22, 1994

The Isaac Lockwood House is a single-family home located at 14011 Verona Road near Marshall. It was listed on the National Register of Historic Places in 1994.

== History ==
Isaac Lockwood was born in 1800 in Delaware County, New York. In 1831, he moved to Marshall, purchased 40 acres, and began farming. His farm was successful, and by 1858 was expanded to 480 acres. Although it is uncertain exactly when he constructed this house, it is thought that it was built in 1853 to 1855 by Marshall builder William Buck. Lockwood also built an unusual Italianate granary near the house, which was later moved across the road to his son's farm. Upon Isaac Lockwood's death in 1873, his farm was split among his three surviving sons, Peter, Henry, and Augustus, with Peter owning the house. Peter Lockwood lived in the house with his wife Amelia, and the property remained in the Lockwood family until Amelia Lockwood sold it in 1912. It was later abandoned, and used as a granary and chicken coop in the 1930s, and had its roof torn off by a tornado in the 1960s. The house was restored in the early 1990s.

== Description ==
The Isaac Lockwood House is a two story brick Italian Villa house with a hip roof; a single story gable-roofed ell is attached to the rear. The main section of the house measures forty by forty feet, and the ell measures eighteen by twenty four feet. The house sits on a cobblestone foundation with a Marshall sandstone water table. The front facade is symmetrical and three bays wide. In the center is a sidelight front entrance with a tripartite window located above. Double hung six over six windows with sandstone lintels and caps are on each side, with the lower windows running to floor length. A wide front porch spans the entire width of the house front. There are three other porches, two on the one side and one on the other.

== Gallery ==
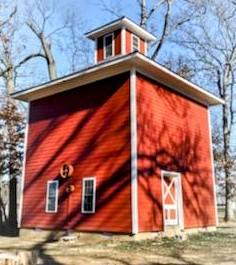
Lockwood/Avery Granary built by Isaac Lockwood and recently moved from the farm across the road to the Calhoun County Fairgrounds and saved via a Community Wide Effort.

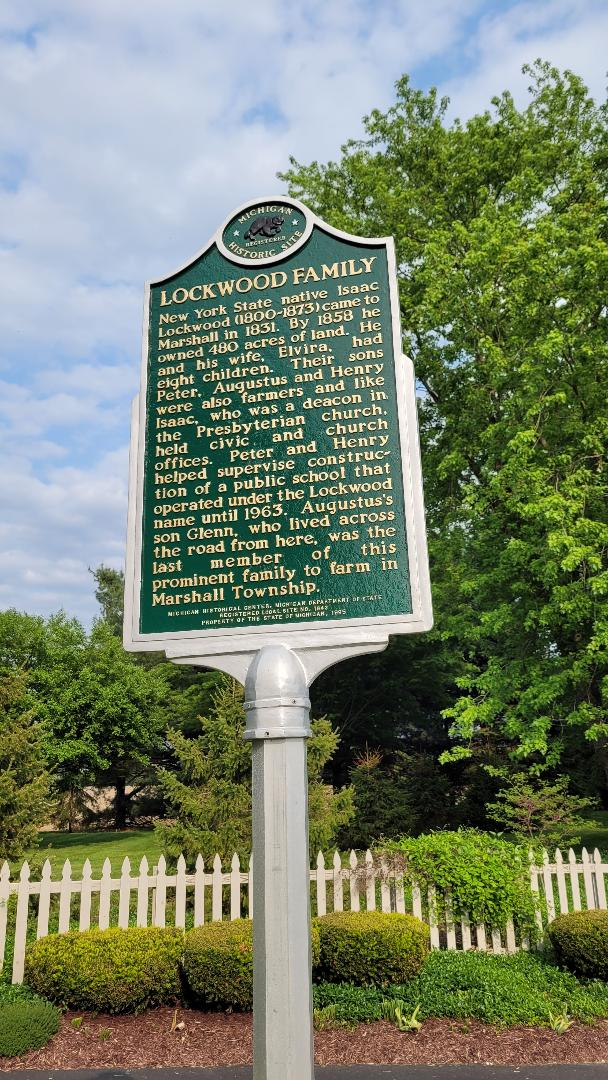
Lockwood Family Marker

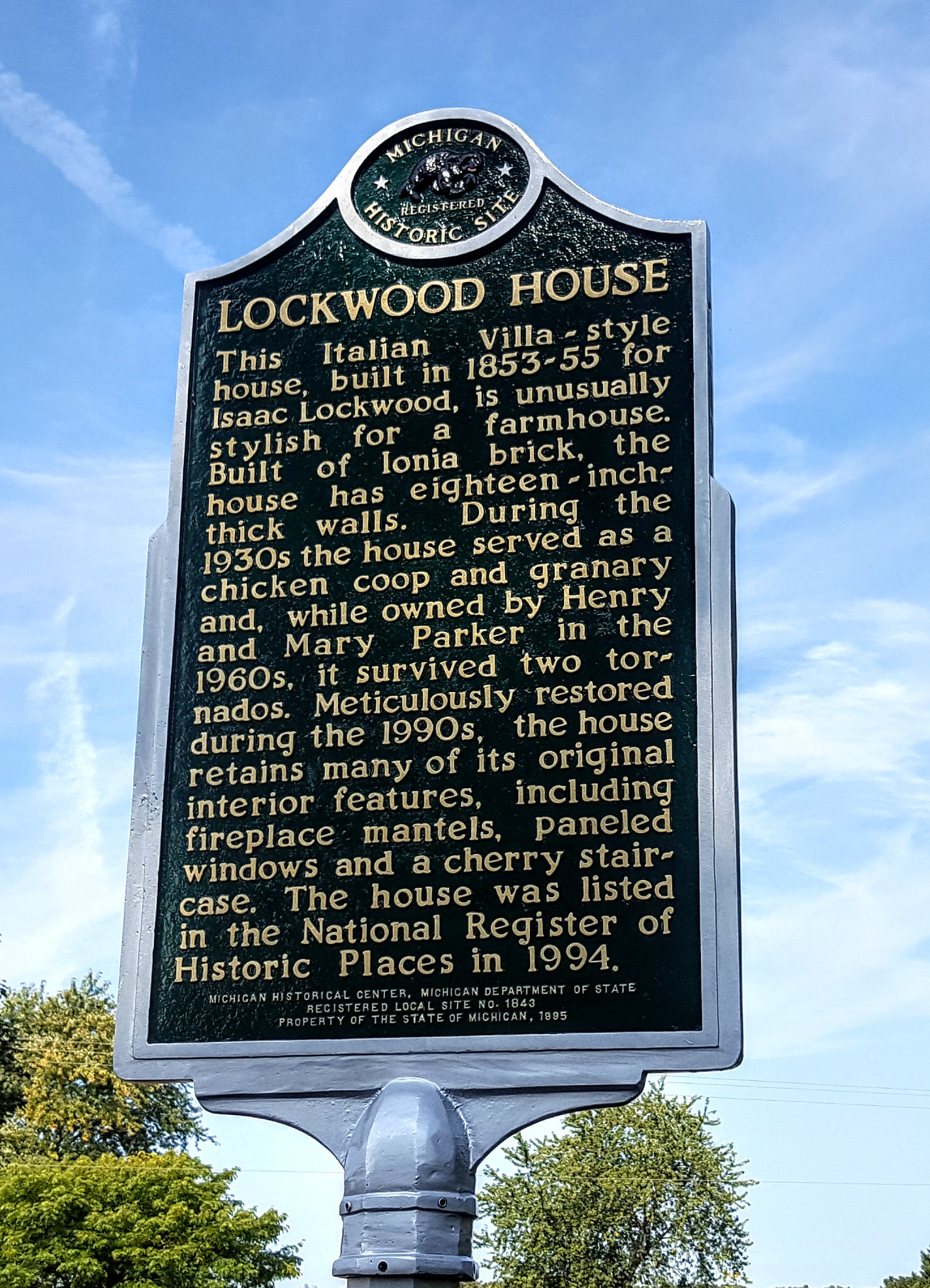
Lockwood House Marker

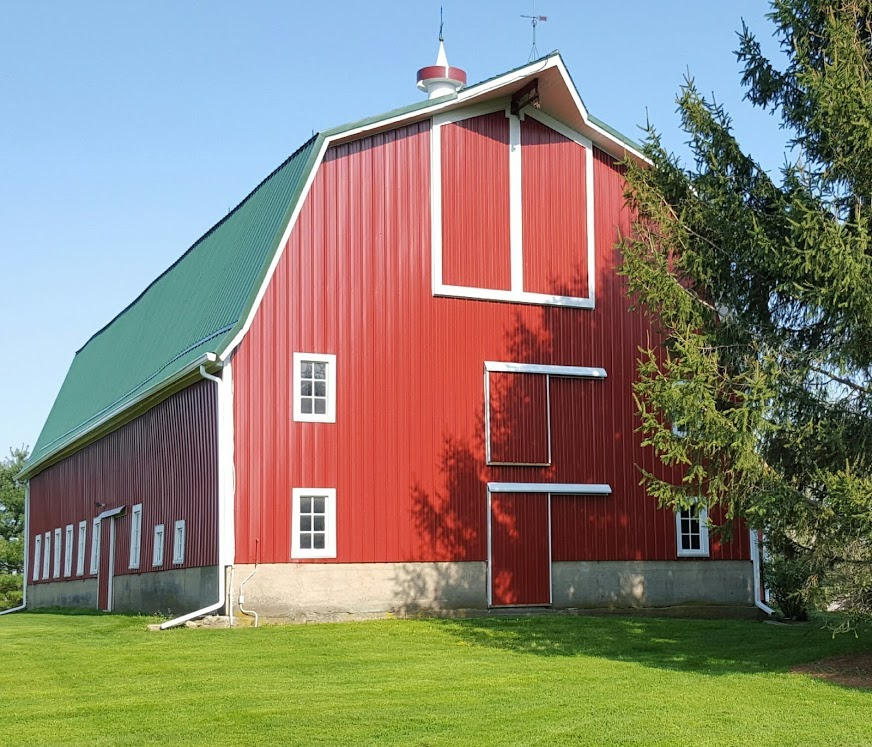
Lockwood Barn
