= Penniman Castle =

House

- U.S. National Register of Historic Places
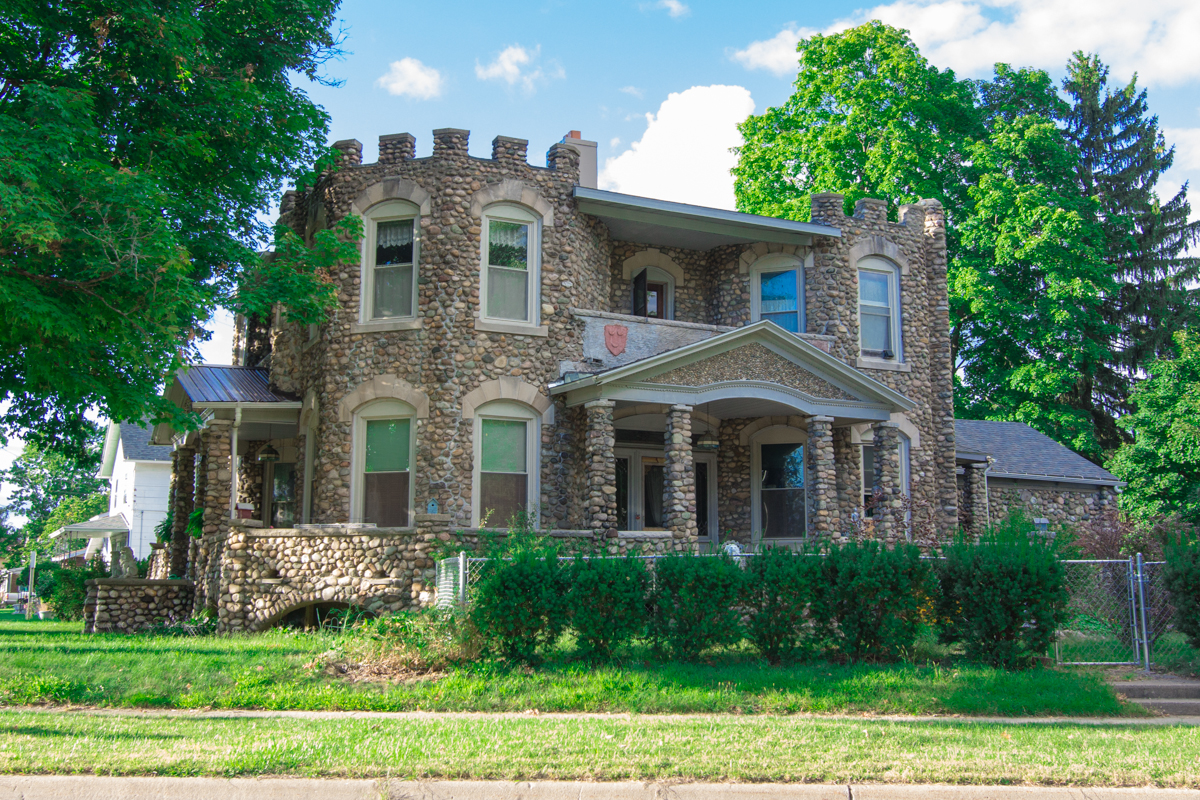
- Interactive map
- Location: 443 Main St., Battle Creek, Michigan
- Coordinates: 42°18′21″N 85°10′12″W
- Area: less than one acre
- Built: 1906
- Built by: Ruel Seeley
- Architect: Herbert C. Chivers
- Architectural style: Castellated
- NRHP reference No.: 01000457
- Added to NRHP: May 2, 2001

Penniman Castle is a single-family home, built to evoke a stone European castle, located at 443 Main Street in Battle Creek, Michigan, United States. It was listed on the National Register of Historic Places in 2001.

== History ==
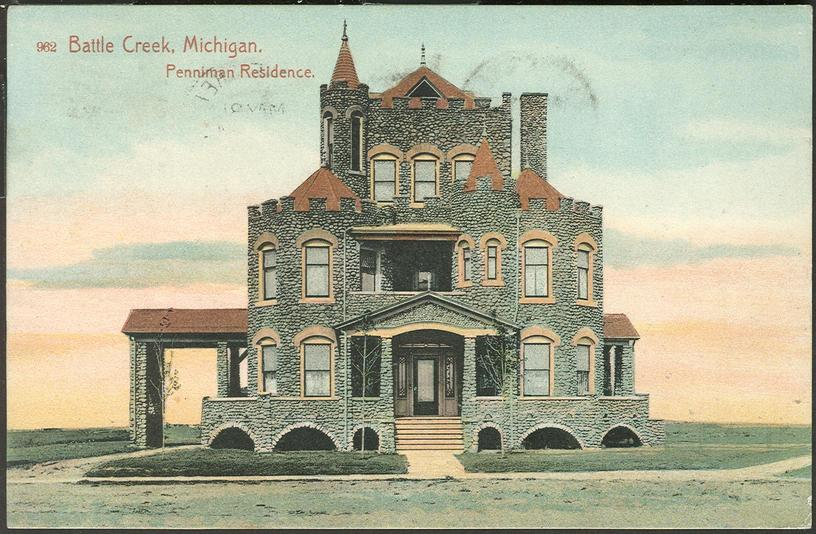
Pennuiman Castle, c. 1908

John H. Penniman was 11 years old in 1857 when he moved with his family from Syracuse, New York to Battle Creek. He studied to become a dentist, and in 1874 married Annie Havens in Battle Creek. The couple had two sons, Allen H. Penniman, born in 1877, and John B. Penniman, born in 1883. John Penniman died in 1886, but left his widow and children a substantial estate. Annie Penniman died in 1899. Allen H. Penniman went on to become a local businessman, and in 1904 married Fayette Marcellus. The couple first lived in the house built by Allen Penniman's father, but in 1905, Allen purchased five lots at the corner of Main Street and Kingman Avenue in a newly platted subdivision being developed by C. W. Post. He hired local builder Ruel Seeley and began construction on a new house, modeled after a design called "Hudson River Residence," published by mail-order plan architect Herbert C. Chivers. Penniman modified the design from the original shingle style to a fieldstone exterior to mimic the look of a Rhineland castle. The house was completed in 1906.

The Pennimans lived in the house until late 1909 or early 1910, when they moved to Los Angeles. The couple had three children, and Fayette died in 1935 and Allen in 1942. The Penniman Castle in Battle Creek was often vacant until 1922, when Glenn M. Hayes, an employee of the Kellogg Company, purchased it. Hayes lived there until about 1930, and the house was again often vacant until 1940, when it was purchased by Floyd K. Settle. A fire in 1941 destroyed the third floor and the roof; the Settles constructed a new roof on top of the second story. They lived in the house until 1954, after which the house had a series of owners.

== Description ==
The Penniman Castle is a two-story, flat-roofed, castle style house with a balloon frame and cobblestone exterior. The house has distinctive octagonal towers at each front corner, a wrap-around porch extending around three sides of the house, a cobblestone porte-cochère, and two second-floor balconies. The windows are one-over-one units with stone lintels and arched stone hoods, many with leaded glass in the upper portion. A single-story garage is attached to the rear of the house. The house is essentially square in shape, with the interior designed around a central octagonal hall, with four octagonal rooms spaced around the outside.
