= Emporium (Baku) =

Department store in Azerbaijan

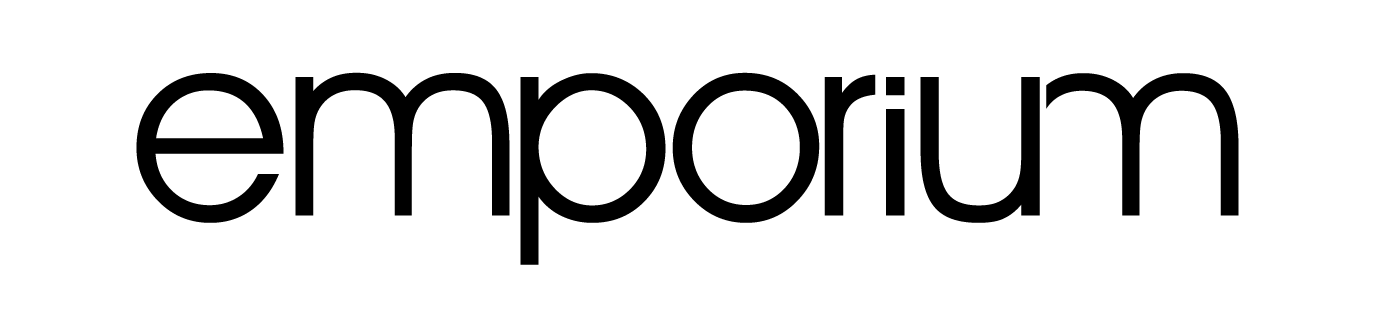

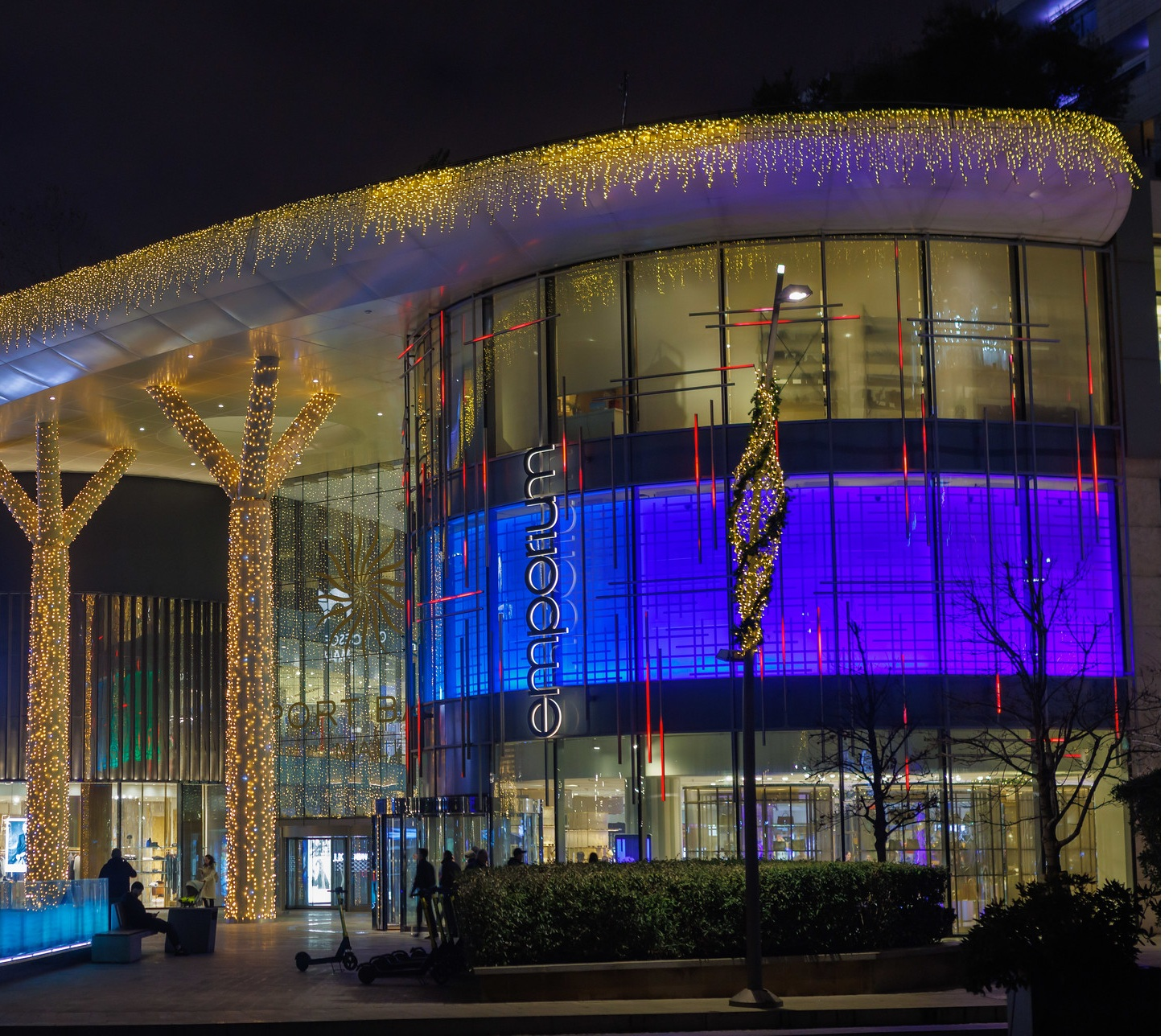
- Exterior of Emporium (2023)
- Interactive map of the Emporium area

General information
- Status: Open
- Type: Department store
- Architectural style: Modern
- Location: Port Baku Towers 151 Neftchilar Avenue, Baku, Azerbaijan
- Coordinates: 40°22′30″N 49°51′37″E
- Opened: 2005
- Owner: Sinteks LLC

Technical details
- Floor area: 12,500 square feet (1,160 m^{2}) of selling space

Design and construction
- Architect: Garde Studio

Other information
- Number of restaurants: 1

Website
- emporium.az

Emporium is a department store operating in the city of Baku. The department store offers clothing, accessories, cosmetics and perfumery, jewellery goods and home items belonging to world‑brands. The department store is located within the Port Baku complex.

The department store offers products of more than 500 international brands. It has an area of 12,500 m² and is the largest department store in Azerbaijan. Among the brands represented in the department store are, from the Kering group:Saint Laurent, Gucci and Bottega Veneta; from the LVMH group: Fendi, Dior, Guerlain, Hermès, Loewe; from the Estée Lauder Group: Estée Lauder, Tom Ford, Kilian Paris, Bobbi Brown; and independently Prada, Miu Miu, Jacquemus, Alexander Wang, Chanel, Jimmy Choo, Dr. Vranjes Firenze, Dolce & Gabbana, Etro, Ralph Lauren, etc.

Emporium, acting as a platform offering famous world‑brands, has cooperated exclusively with McQueen and hosted several fashion shows as an industry leader. The department store accepts around 400,000 visitors annually, over 60,000 of whom are tourists.

== History ==
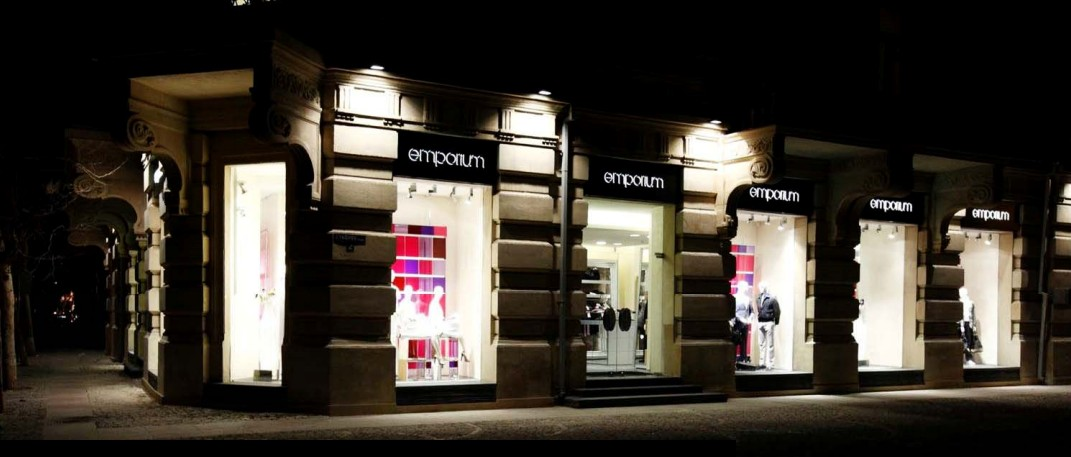
The first Emporium building, located in a historic building on Neftchilar Avenue

The first Emporium store in Baku, located in a historic building on Neftchilar Avenue and covering an area of 700 m², was opened in 2005. This store was one of the venues in Azerbaijan presenting international fashion brands.

In 2008, the company opened its second store called “Emporium Scoop”, and in 2011 in the Port Baku Towers complex, designed by the Japanese firm GARDE, it opened a 2,500 m² store.

In 2014, at the address Port Baku Mall, the store was formed as a 12,500 m², three‑floor department store and the stores “Emporium Men” and “Emporium Young” were launched. The main architectural projects for these spaces were also prepared by the GARDE design studio.

== Building and architecture ==
In the interior design of the department store, elements of East and West are combined: marble surfaces, textured stone wall claddings, and a harmony of wood materials create open and planned environments. Within Emporium’s concept, the GARDE architecture studio enriched the interior with avant‑garde, ethnic and minimalist styles. As a central element: marble and perforated metal elements, stepped podiums and specially designed niches; navigation panels and large screens created a modern experience atmosphere.

== Departments and brands ==
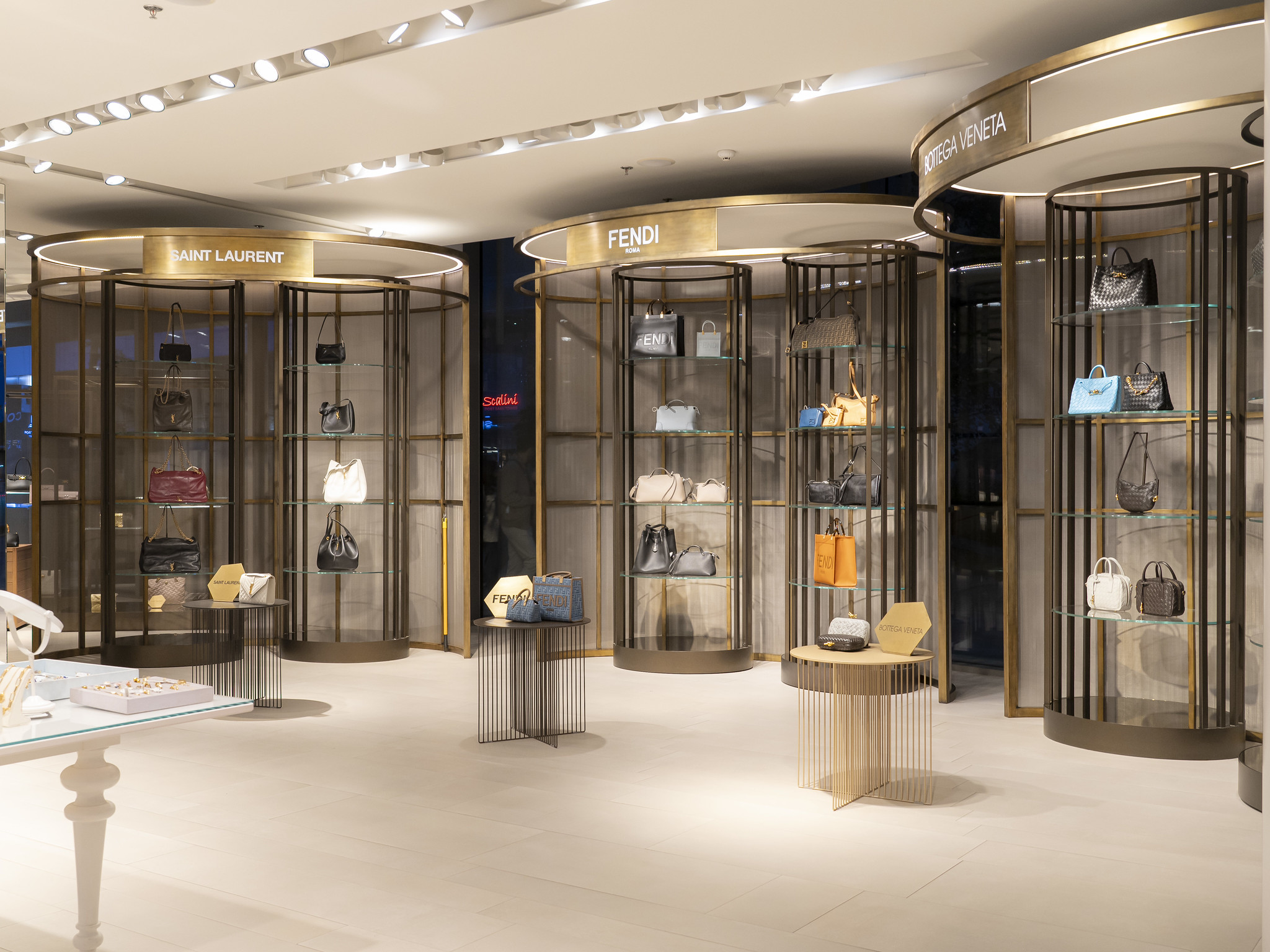
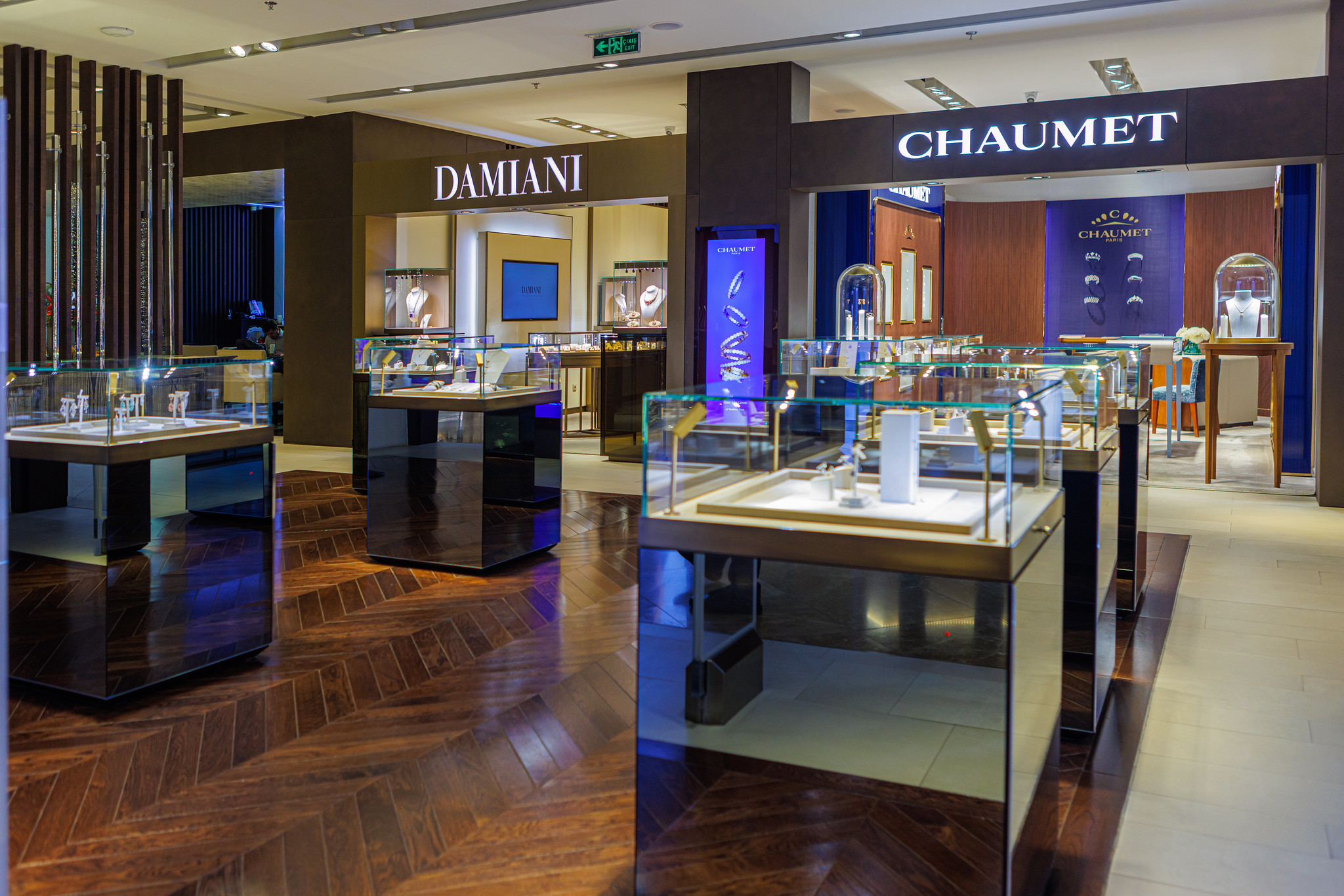
General view of the department store's shoe and accessories, as well as jewelry departments

In the Women’s clothing Department, concept corners of brands such as Gucci, Moncler, Saint Laurent, Bottega Veneta operate. At the same time, designer brands such as Prada, Miu Miu, Loewe, Victoria Beckham, David Koma, Zimmermann are offered. In the Shoes and Accessories section, products of brands including Saint Laurent, Bottega Veneta, Gucci, Prada, Miu Miu, Coach and others are presented. Fashion jewellery items from brands such as Fendi, Versace, Saint Laurent, and others are also presented here.

In the Menswear Department of Emporium, alongside brands such as Dior, Gucci, Fendi, Prada, there are also brands such as Lubiam, Caruso, Zegna.

In the Kids section, products of Dolce & Gabbana, Ralph Lauren, Dior, Emporio Armani, Burberry are available; while Emporium Young Department presents such brands such as Jacquemus, Acne Studios, Alexander Wang, Toteme, Christopher Esber, Ganni, Sporty & Rich and more. This section also hosts pop‑up presentations and meetings with young designers.

The Jewelry section of the store features famous brands such as Chaumet, Damiani. During a visit of family representative Giorgio Damiani to Baku, the model Madalina Genea, who is the official ambassador of the brand, attended the Damiani event at Emporium.

In the Beauty Department, products from brands such as Hermès, Chanel, Dior, Givenchy, Tom Ford, Giorgio Armani Beauty, Hermès Beauty, YSL Beauty, La Mer, Guerlain, and others are presented. The department regularly hosts master classes, product presentations, and themed events. Meetings have also been held here with the founders of niche perfumery brands such as Tiziana Terenzi, Alexandre J, and others.

In the Home Department, inter‑interior and lifestyle products of brands such as Dolce & Gabbana, Ralph Lauren, Etro, L’Objet and others are presented.

== Cultural impact ==
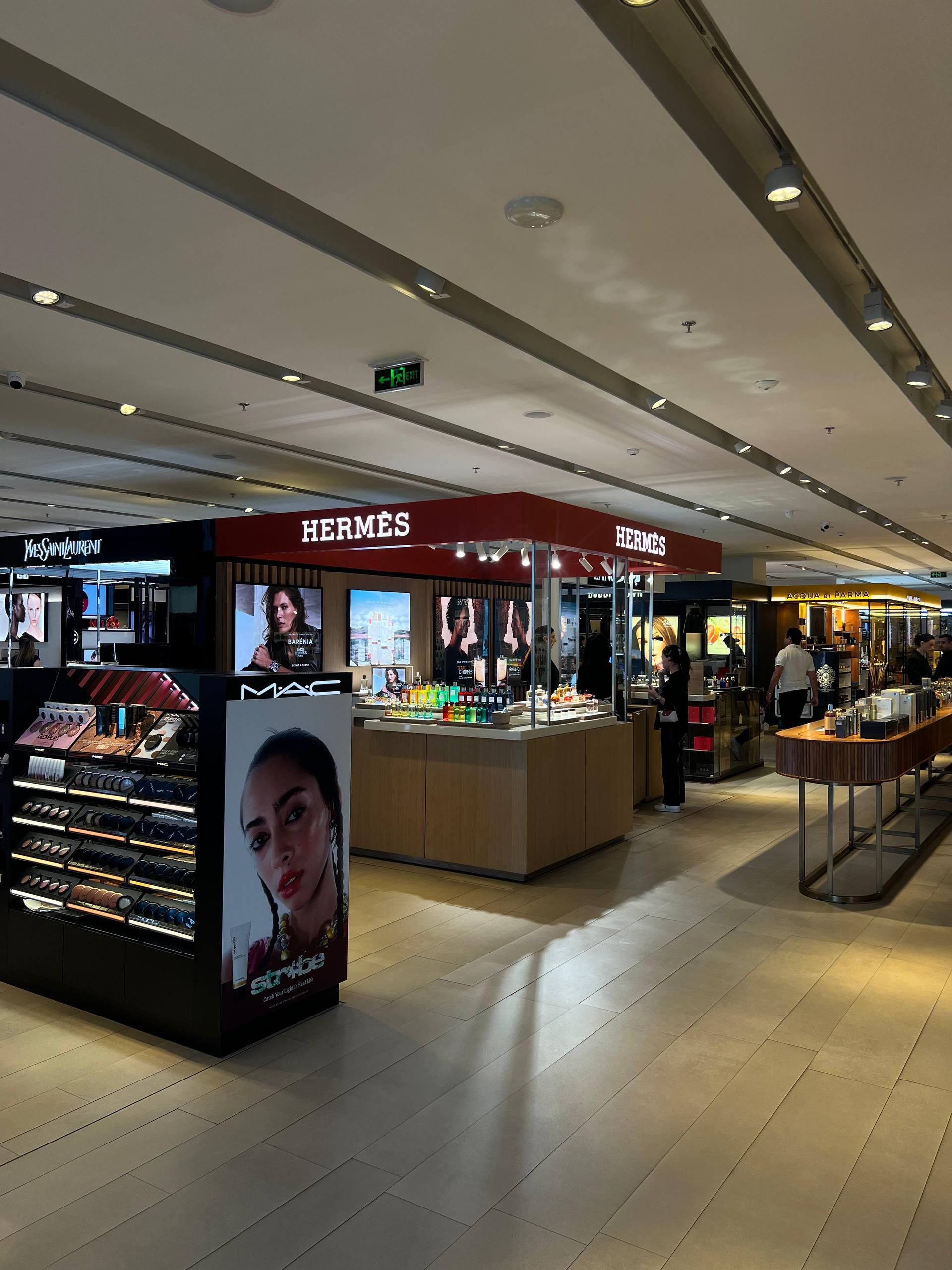
Perfumery and cosmetics department.

In local and international media, Emporium is recognized as one of Baku’s main fashion destinations. Vogue Russia compared its boutique interior and presentation style to the well‑known fashion houses of Paris and London.

The French magazine Le Point called Emporium “Azerbaijan’s luxury symbol”. Several international fashion houses, including Alexander McQueen and Elie Saab, have offered exclusive collections created specifically for Emporium customers.

In the Women Department of Emporium, presentations of designer brands such as David Koma, Yves Salomon, and Elie Saab have been held.

During the COVID‑19 pandemic, Emporium held the first online fashion show in Baku.
