= Emporio =

Emporio or Emporeio may refer to:

- Emporio (Hamburg), a high-rise office building in Hamburg, Germany
- Emporio, Chios, an ancient site in Chios, Greece, whose antiquities are displayed in the Archaeological Museum of Chios
- Emporio, Halki, one of two parts of Halki, Greece
- Emporio, Kozani, a village in Kozani, Greece
- Emporeio, Santorini, a village on the island of Santorini, Greece
- DLF Emporio, a shopping mall in Vasant Kunj, Delhi

== See also ==
- Emporio Armani, a clothing label of Giorgio Armani
- Emporion, ancient name of Empúries, Catalonia, Spain
