= Emporium (Marshall, Michigan) =

- U.S. National Register of Historic Places
- U.S. National Historic Landmark District – Contributing property
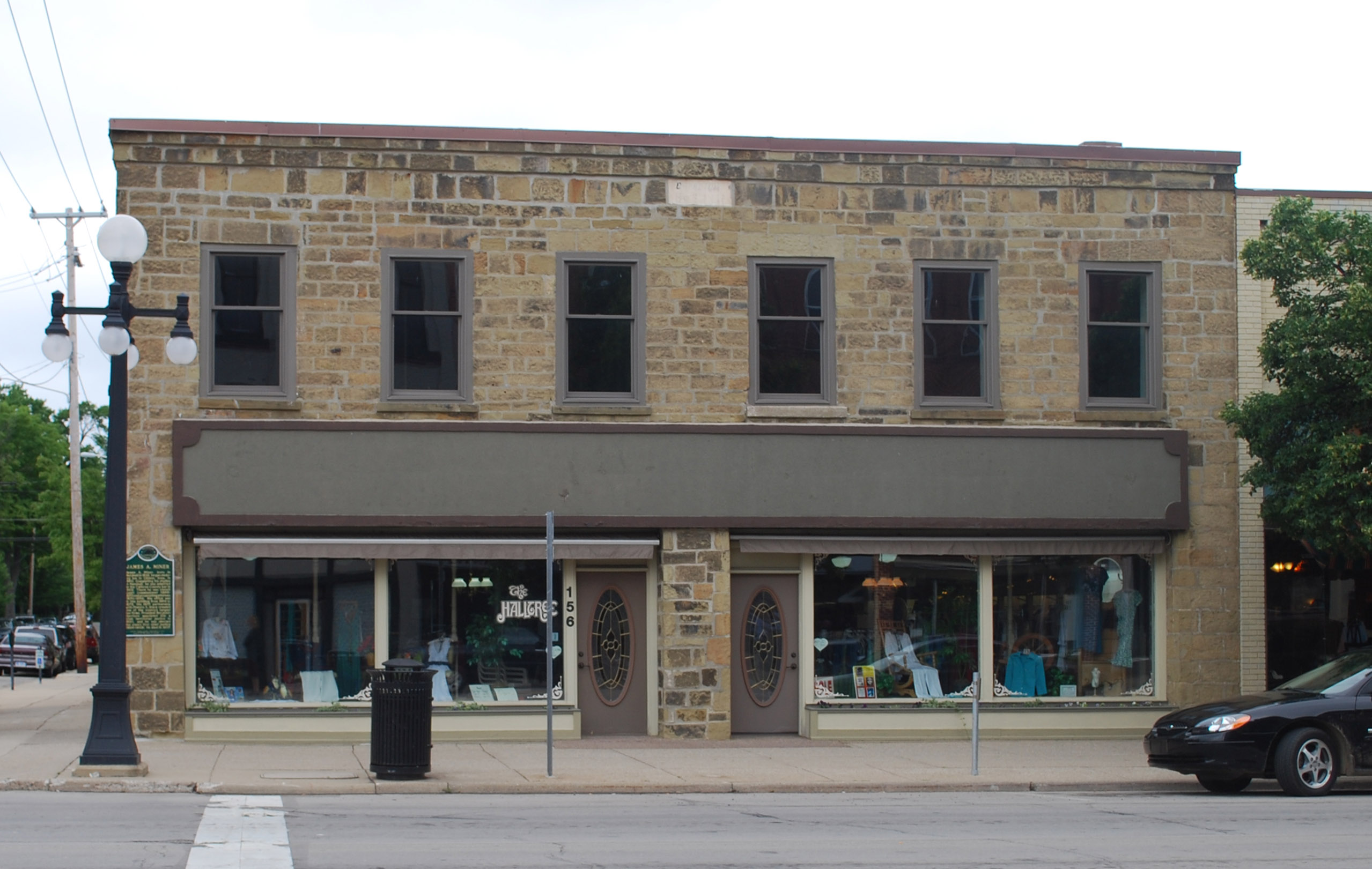
- Interactive map
- Location: 154-156 W. Michigan Ave., Marshall, Michigan
- Coordinates: 42°16′19″N 84°57′35″W
- Area: less than one acre
- Built: 1847
- Architectural style: Greek Revival vernacular
- Part of: Marshall Michigan Historic Landmark District (ID91002053)
- NRHP reference No.: 79001151
- Added to NRHP: August 9, 1979

The Emporium is a commercial building located at 154-156 West Michigan Avenue in Marshall, Michigan. It was listed on the National Register of Historic Places in 1979.

== History ==
The Emporium was constructed in 1847 for Dr. Andrew L. Hayes and Edward Butler. Hayes was one of Marshall's first settlers, and Calhoun County's first physician, having arrived in 1831. Businessman Edward Butler arrived in Marshall 1836, and operated a general store between 1840 and 1845. It is likely that the Emporium originally contained Butler's store and Hayes' office, among other tenants. Later tenants significantly included James A. Miner, who was elected chief justice of the Utah Supreme Court in the early 1900s.

== Description ==
The Emporium is a three-story vernacular Greek Revival commercial building constructed of sandstone blocks. It measures forty-five feet wide by fifty-six feet deep, and has a flat roof slanting slightly downward from front to back. The front facade is symmetrical, spanning six bays wide. The first floor contains two storefronts, whose display windows have been updated from the original construction. The second story has square-head windows trimmed with sawn sandstone lintels and sills. The low attic story contains sunken panels located between the window bays.
