= Gardner House =

Gardner House may refer to:

in the United States

(by state)

- Isaac Gardner, Sr., House, Tampa, Florida, listed on the National Register of Historic Places (NRHP)
- Robert W. Gardner House, Quincy, Illinois, NRHP-listed
- Gardner House (Northtown, Kentucky), listed on the NRHP in Kentucky
- Judge D. W. Gardner House, Salyersville, Kentucky, listed on the NRHP in Kentucky
- Isabella Stewart Gardner Museum, Boston, Massachusetts, NRHP-listed
- Addington Gardner House, Sherborn, Massachusetts, NRHP-listed
- Francis L. Gardner House, Swansea, Massachusetts, NRHP-listed
- Joseph Gardner House, Swansea, Massachusetts, NRHP-listed
- Preserved Gardner House, Swansea, Massachusetts, NRHP-listed
- Samuel Gardner House, Swansea, Massachusetts, NRHP-listed
- Edward Gardner House, Winchester, Massachusetts, NRHP-listed
- O. W. Gardner House, Winchester, Massachusetts, NRHP-listed
- Patience and Sarah Gardner House, Winchester, Massachusetts, NRHP-listed
- Gardner House (Albion, Michigan), NRHP-listed
- Gardner House (Palmyra, Missouri), NRHP-listed
- Terhune-Gardner-Lindenmeyr House, Paramus, New Jersey, NRHP-listed
- Wentworth-Gardner and Tobias Lear Houses, Portsmouth, New Hampshire, NRHP-listed
- Wentworth-Gardner House, Portsmouth, New Hampshire, NRHP-listed
- Silas Gardner House, Gardnertown, New York, NRHP-listed
- Gardner House (Guilderland, New York), NRHP-listed
- Gardner House (Jamestown, North Carolina), NRHP-listed
- Gardner House (Worthington, Ohio), listed on the NRHP in Ohio
- Jefferson Gardner House, Eagletown, Oklahoma, listed on the NRHP in Oklahoma
- Gardner-Bailey House, Pittsburgh, Pennsylvania, NRHP-listed
- Ezekial Gardner House, North Kingstown, Rhode Island, NRHP-listed
- R. R. Gardner House, South Kingstown, Rhode Island, NRHP-listed
- Matt Gardner House, Elkton, Tennessee, listed on the NRHP in Tennessee
- James H. and Rhoda H. Gardner House, Lehi, Utah, NRHP-listed
- James Gardner House, Mendon, Utah, NRHP-listed
- Ira W. Gardner House, Salem, Utah, NRHP-listed
- Archibald R. and Violet Clark Gardner House, Sandy, Utah, listed on the NRHP in Salt Lake County, Utah
- Gardner-Mays Cottage, Charlottesville, Virginia, NRHP-listed
- Crawford-Gardner House, Charleston, West Virginia, NRHP-listed
