= First Colored Baptist Church =

First Colored Baptist Church may refer to:

Alphabetical by state

- First Colored Baptist Church (San Francisco, California), now the Third Baptist Church
- First Colored Baptist Church (Bowling Green, Kentucky), now State Street Baptist Church, listed on the U.S. National Register of Historic Places
- First Colored Baptist Church (Memphis, Tennessee), now First Baptist Church, Lauderdale, NRHP-listed
- First Colored Baptist Church (Charlottesville, Virginia), now Delevan Baptist Church, NRHP-listed
