= Fifeville and Tonsler Neighborhoods Historic District =

Historic district in Virginia, United States

- Fifeville and Tonsler Neighborhood Historic District
- U.S. National Register of Historic Places
- U.S. Historic district
- Virginia Landmarks Register
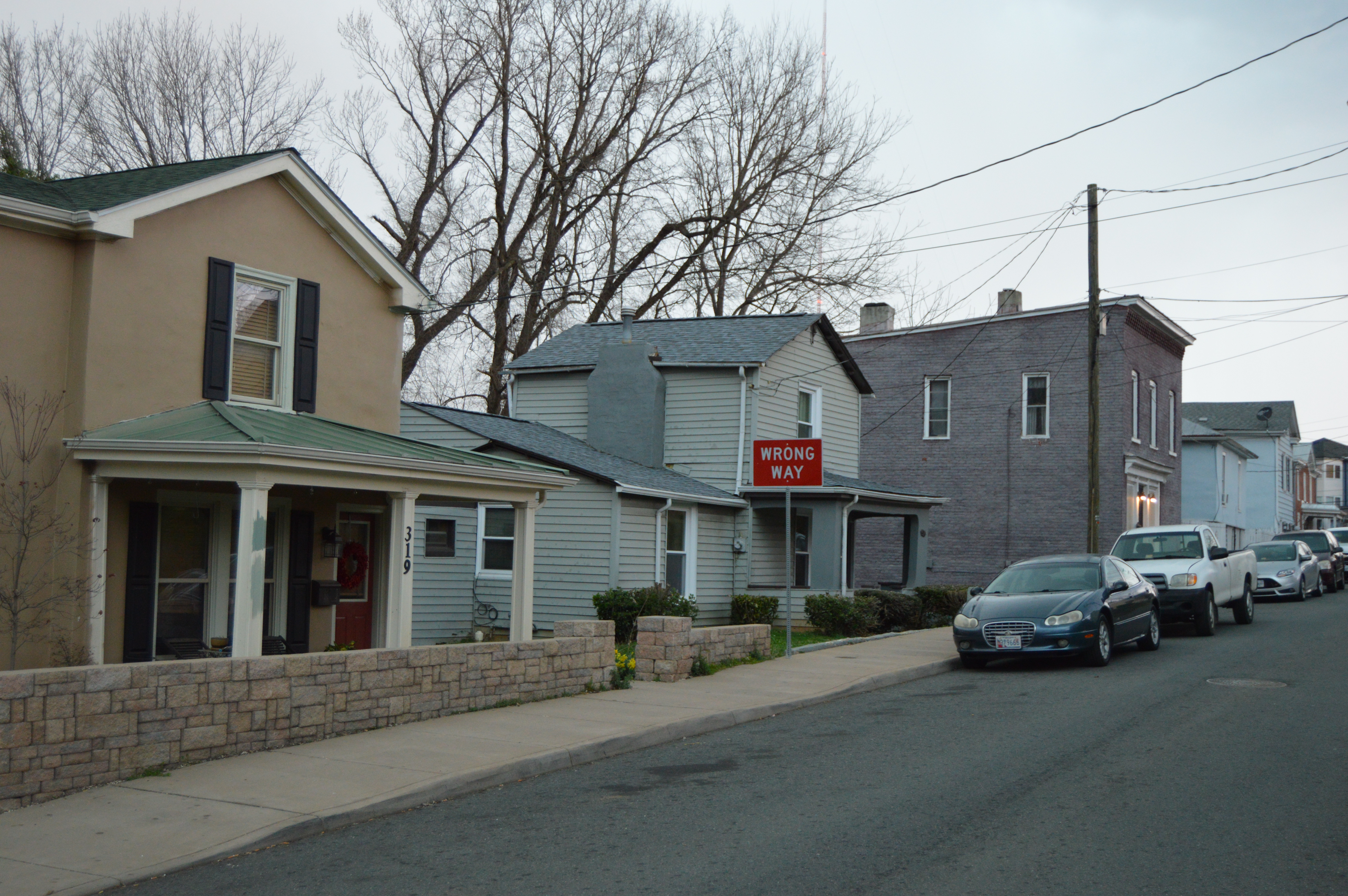
- Fifth Street south of Dice Street

- Location within Virginia Location within the United States
- Location: Bounded by Cherry Ave, to the S., the railway to the N., 4th St., SW to the E., and Spring St., to the W., Charlottesville, Virginia
- Coordinates: 38°1′46″N 78°29′35″W
- Area: 56 acres (23 ha)
- Built: 1822
- Built by: Hawkins, Coles, Shelton, Watson, Updike; J. Nalls; James Dinsmore
- Architectural style: Early Republic, Gothic Revival, Bungalow Craftsman
- NRHP reference No.: 09000452
- VLR No.: 104-0213

Significant dates
- Added to NRHP: June 18, 2009
- Designated VLR: March 20, 2008

Fifeville and Tonsler Neighborhood Historic District is a national historic district located at Charlottesville, Virginia. The district encompasses 264 contributing buildings and 3 contributing sites in a predominantly African-American residential section of the city of Charlottesville. It was developed between 1890 and the 1930s and includes examples of the Bungalow and Gothic Revival styles. The oldest is dated to 1822. Located in the district are the separately listed Oak Lawn, Benjamin Tonsler House, Delevan Baptist Church, and Gardner-Mays Cottage.

It was listed on the National Register of Historic Places in 2009.

== Events ==
A cross was burned in this neighborhood, at Cherry Avenue and Apple Street, near Ridge Street, on 15 August 1950. Three white men left the scene before they could be identified. The cross was made of burlap bags and boards. It was small at only 2 and a half feet high. Police made a routine investigation, but assistant Police Chief James E. Adams claimed that they could not determine the identity of the men or the reason for the cross burning.
