= Oak Lawn (Charlottesville, Virginia) =

Historic house in Virginia, United States

- U.S. National Register of Historic Places
- U.S. Historic district – Contributing property
- Virginia Landmarks Register
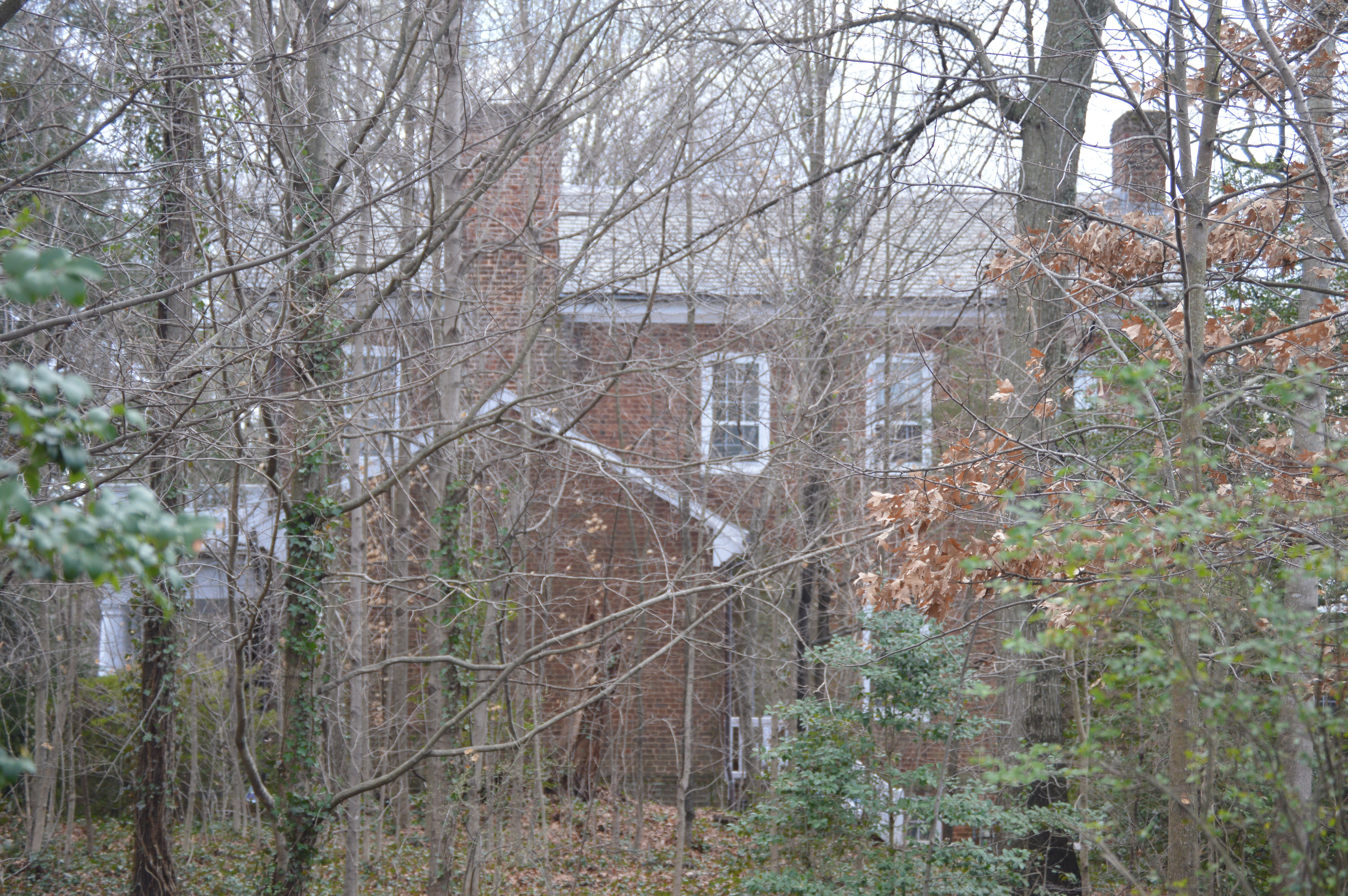
- Northern side, seen through the trees

- Location within Virginia Location within the United States
- Location: Cherry Ave. and 9th St., Charlottesville, Virginia
- Coordinates: 38°1′41″N 78°29′47″W
- Area: 10 acres (4.0 ha)
- Built: 1822
- Built by: James Dinsmore
- Architectural style: Early Republic, Jeffersonian classicism
- Part of: Fifeville and Tonsler Neighborhoods Historic District (ID09000452)
- NRHP reference No.: 73002204
- VLR No.: 104-0031

Significant dates
- Added to NRHP: May 25, 1973
- Designated CP: June 18, 2009
- Designated VLR: April 17, 1973

Oak Lawn is a historic home located at Charlottesville, Virginia. The brick dwelling was built in 1822, and consists of a two-story, four-bay, main block flanked by one-story, two-bay wings. The central section has a front gable roof and one-story porch with a flat roof supported by four Tuscan order columns and topped by a second story balcony. Exterior chimneys arise between the main block and each of the wings. Also on the property are a contributing kitchen (1822) and two cemeteries. It was built by James Dinsmore, a Scots-Irish builder who worked for Thomas Jefferson.

It was listed on the National Register of Historic Places in 1973. It is located in the Fifeville and Tonsler Neighborhoods Historic District.
