= Benjamin Tonsler House =

Historic house in Virginia, United States

- U.S. National Register of Historic Places
- U.S. Historic district – Contributing property
- Virginia Landmarks Register
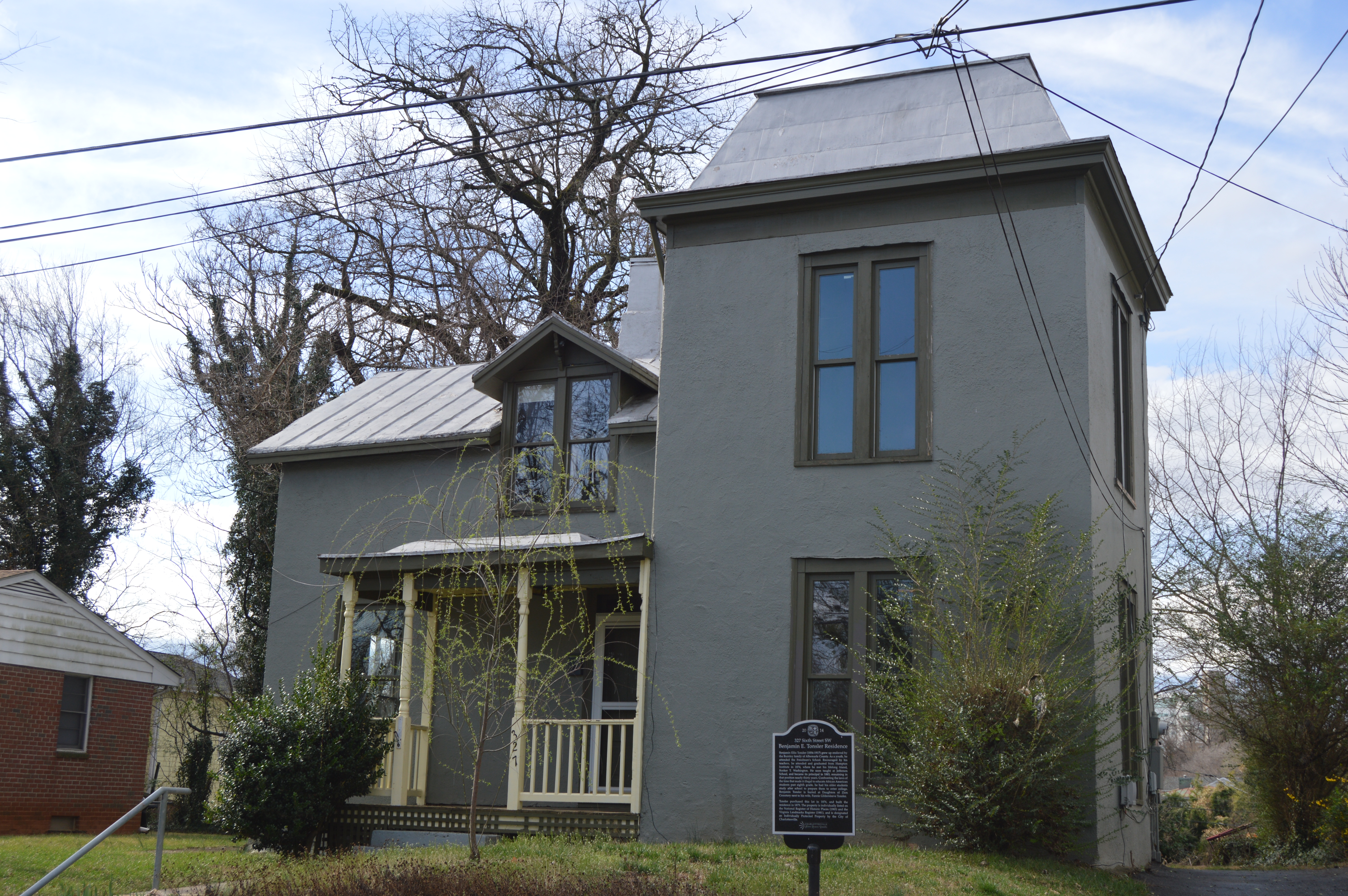
- Front of the house

- Location within Virginia Location within the United States
- Location: 327 6th St., Charlottesville, Virginia
- Coordinates: 38°1′41″N 78°29′27″W
- Area: 0.1 acres (0.040 ha)
- Built: 1879
- Architectural style: Late Victorian
- Part of: Fifeville and Tonsler Neighborhoods Historic District (ID09000452)
- MPS: Charlottesville MRA
- NRHP reference No.: 83003274
- VLR No.: 104-0233

Significant dates
- Added to NRHP: August 10, 1983
- Designated CP: June 18, 2009
- Designated VLR: October 20, 1981

Benjamin Tonsler House is a historic home located at Charlottesville, Virginia. It was built in 1879, and is a two-story, stuccoed frame Late Victorian dwelling with elements of the Italianate and Second Empire styles. It has a rear wing, high-pitched gable roof, and a projecting corner tower with a mansard roof.

It was listed on the National Register of Historic Places in 1983. It is located in the Fifeville and Tonsler Neighborhoods Historic District.
