= Terhune–Gardner–Lindenmeyr House =

Historic house in New Jersey, United States

- U.S. National Register of Historic Places
- New Jersey Register of Historic Places
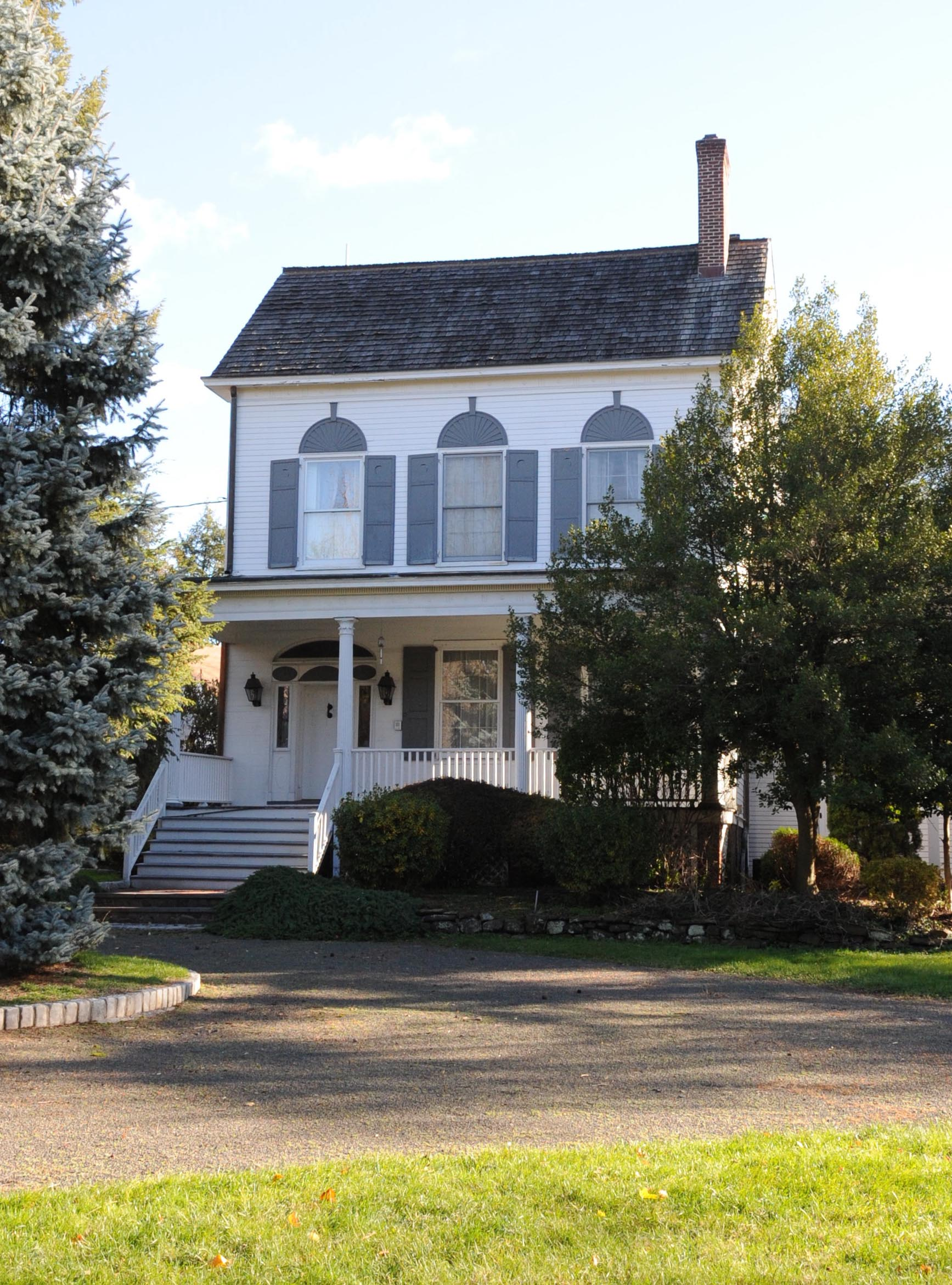
- Terhune–Gardner–Lindenmeyr House in 2015

- Location within Bergen County, New Jersey Location within New Jersey Location within the United States
- Location: 218 Paramus Road, Paramus, New Jersey
- Coordinates: 40°56′27″N 74°5′33″W
- Area: 3 acres (1.2 ha)
- Built: 1735
- Architectural style: Federal
- NRHP reference No.: 72000769
- NJRHP No.: 618

Significant dates
- Added to NRHP: February 7, 1972
- Designated NJRHP: November 19, 1971

Terhune–Gardner–Lindenmeyr House is located in Paramus, Bergen County, New Jersey, United States. The house was built in 1707 and was added to the National Register of Historic Places on February 7, 1972.

== See also ==
- National Register of Historic Places listings in Bergen County, New Jersey

Historic Registry==References==
