= Delevan Baptist Church =

Historic church in Virginia, United States

- U.S. National Register of Historic Places
- U.S. Historic district – Contributing property
- Virginia Landmarks Register
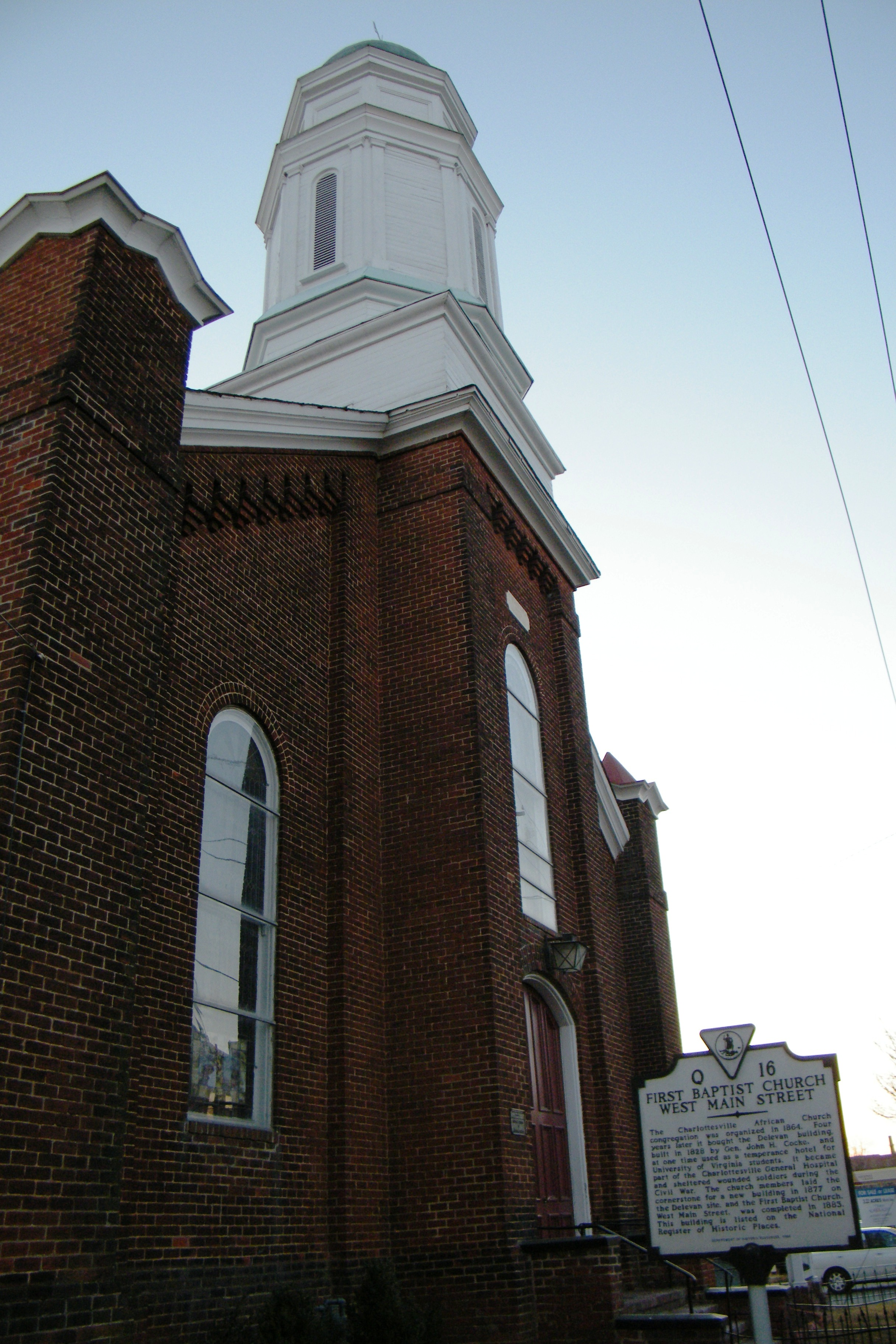

- Location within Virginia Location within the United States
- Location: 632 W. Main St., Charlottesville, Virginia
- Coordinates: 38°1′51″N 78°29′24″W
- Area: less than one acre
- Built: 1883
- Architectural style: Romanesque, Victorian Romanesque
- Part of: Fifeville and Tonsler Neighborhoods Historic District (ID09000452)
- MPS: Charlottesville MRA
- NRHP reference No.: 82001802
- VLR No.: 104-0376

Significant dates
- Added to NRHP: October 21, 1982
- Designated CP: June 18, 2009
- Designated VLR: October 20, 1981

Delevan Baptist Church, also known as First Baptist Church and First Colored Baptist Church, is a historic African-American Baptist church building located at 632 W. Main Street in Charlottesville, Virginia. It was built in 1883, and is a one-story, three bay by six bay, Victorian Romanesque style brick church. It sits on a raised basement and features with a square projecting central tower topped by a large octagonal lantern on a square base, both of wood.

It was added to the National Register of Historic Places in 1982. It is located in the Fifeville and Tonsler Neighborhoods Historic District.
