= James H. and Rhoda H. Gardner House =

Historic house in Utah, United States

- U.S. National Register of Historic Places
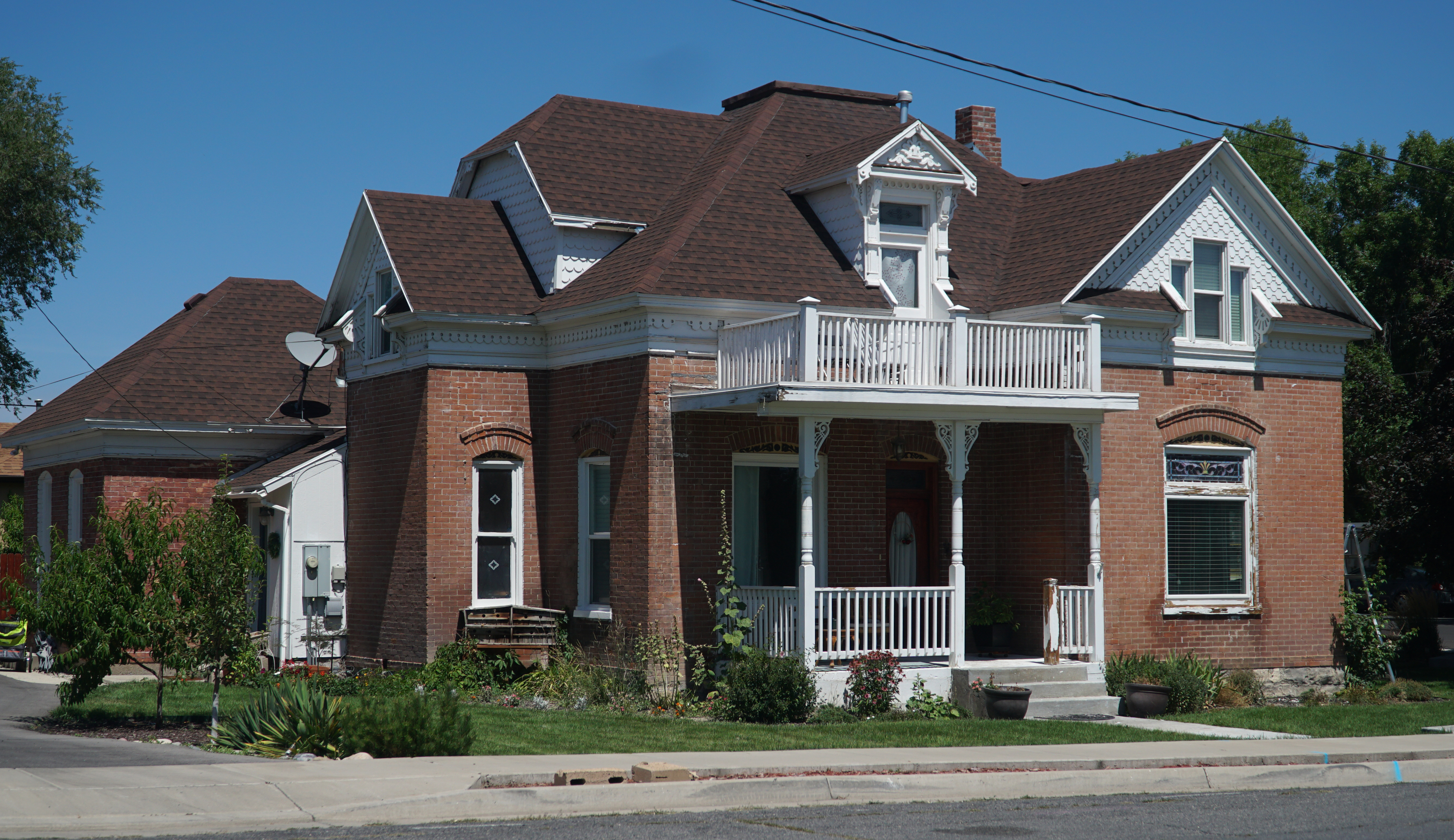

- Location within Utah Location within the United States
- Location: 187 East 300 North, Lehi, Utah
- Coordinates: 40°23′39″N 111°50′47″W
- Area: less than one acre
- Built: 1907
- Architectural style: Late Victorian, Victorian eclectic, Other
- MPS: Lehi, Utah MPS
- NRHP reference No.: 98001454
- Added to NRHP: December 4, 1998

The James H. and Rhoda H. Gardner House at 187 East 300 North in Lehi, Utah, United States, was built in 1907. It was listed on the National Register of Historic Places in 1998.

It was home of James Gardner, whose experience sugar refining from sugar cane in Hawaii, who first successfully boiled sugar from sugar beets in Utah in 1891, working for the Utah Sugar Company.
