= Gardner House (Albion, Michigan) =

- U.S. National Register of Historic Places
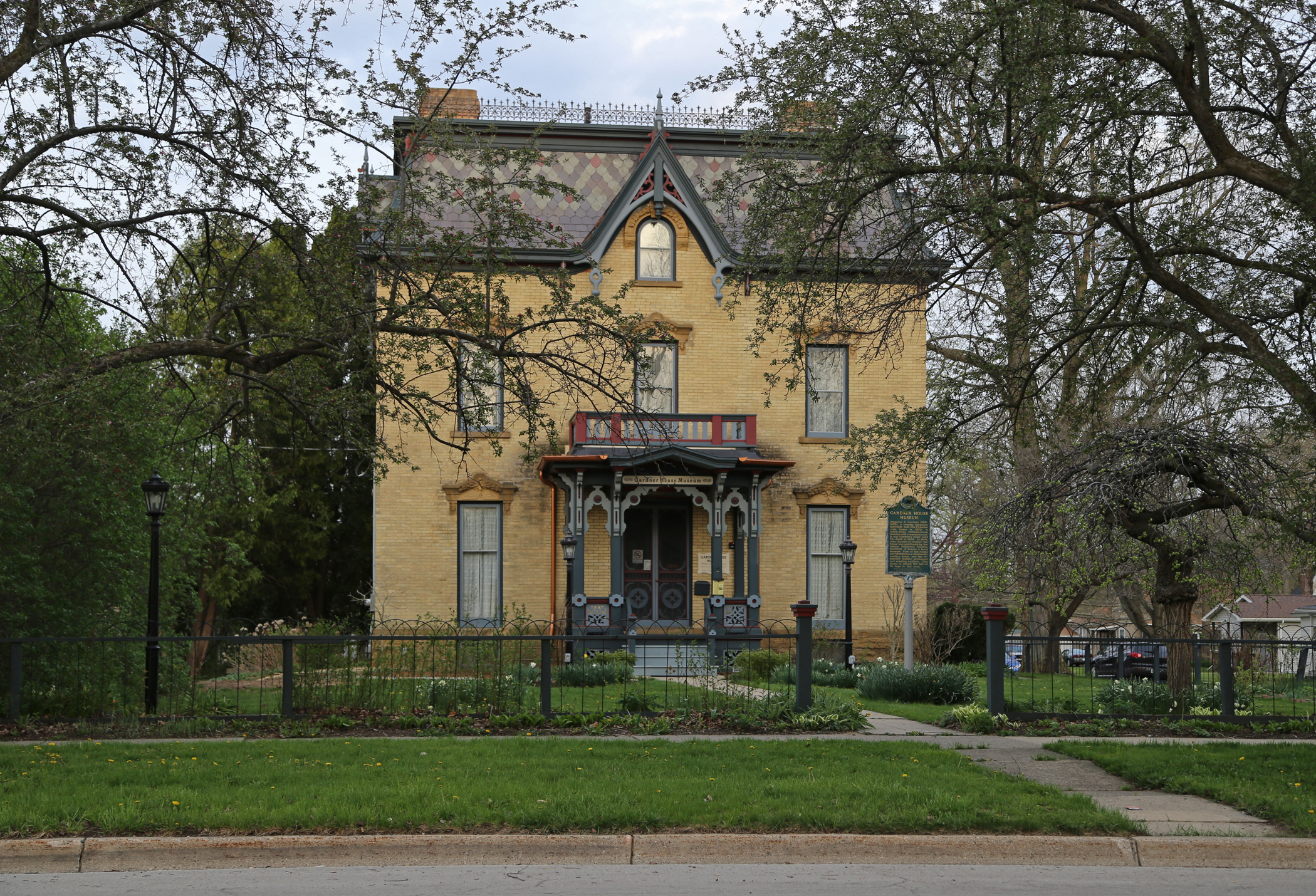
- Interactive map
- Location: 509 S. Superior St., Albion, Michigan
- Coordinates: 42°14′30″N 84°45′10″W
- Area: less than one acre
- Built: 1875
- Architectural style: Gothic
- NRHP reference No.: 71000383
- Added to NRHP: May 6, 1971

The Gardner House, also known as the A. P. Gardner Mansion, was built as a single-family home located at 509 South Superior Street in Albion, Michigan. It was listed on the National Register of Historic Places in 1971. It now houses the Gardner House Museum.

== History ==
Augustus P. Gardner came from New York state to Albion in 1837 as a young man. He became Albion's leading hardware merchant, and in 1875 built this large house for his own use. It became a showplace and the center of Albion's society in the late 19th century. Gardner lived in the house until his death in 1905. The house passed to his daughter Belle Gardner Gale after his death, and she sold the house to Henry Wochholz in 1909. The house was purchased by the city of Albion in 1963. It was slated for demolition in 1966. The Albion Historical Society purchased the house and renovated it, opening it up as a museum. The house was renovated in 1988.

== Description ==
The Gardner House is a two-story Gothic Victorian brick mansion with alternating shades of yellow brick. It has a mansard roof with shingles set in an imbricated pattern. The form and detail of the exterior porches and towers exhibit typical Gothic elements of style. The house has a bay entrance porch with a double door and a bay window on the side of the house. The roofs of both the porch and the bay window have box cornices with decorative bracketry. The mansard roof contains round arch gabled windows. Vergeboards in the window coverings are carved, as are the ornamental pendants present.
