= Francis L. Gardner House =

Historic house in Massachusetts, United States

- U.S. National Register of Historic Places
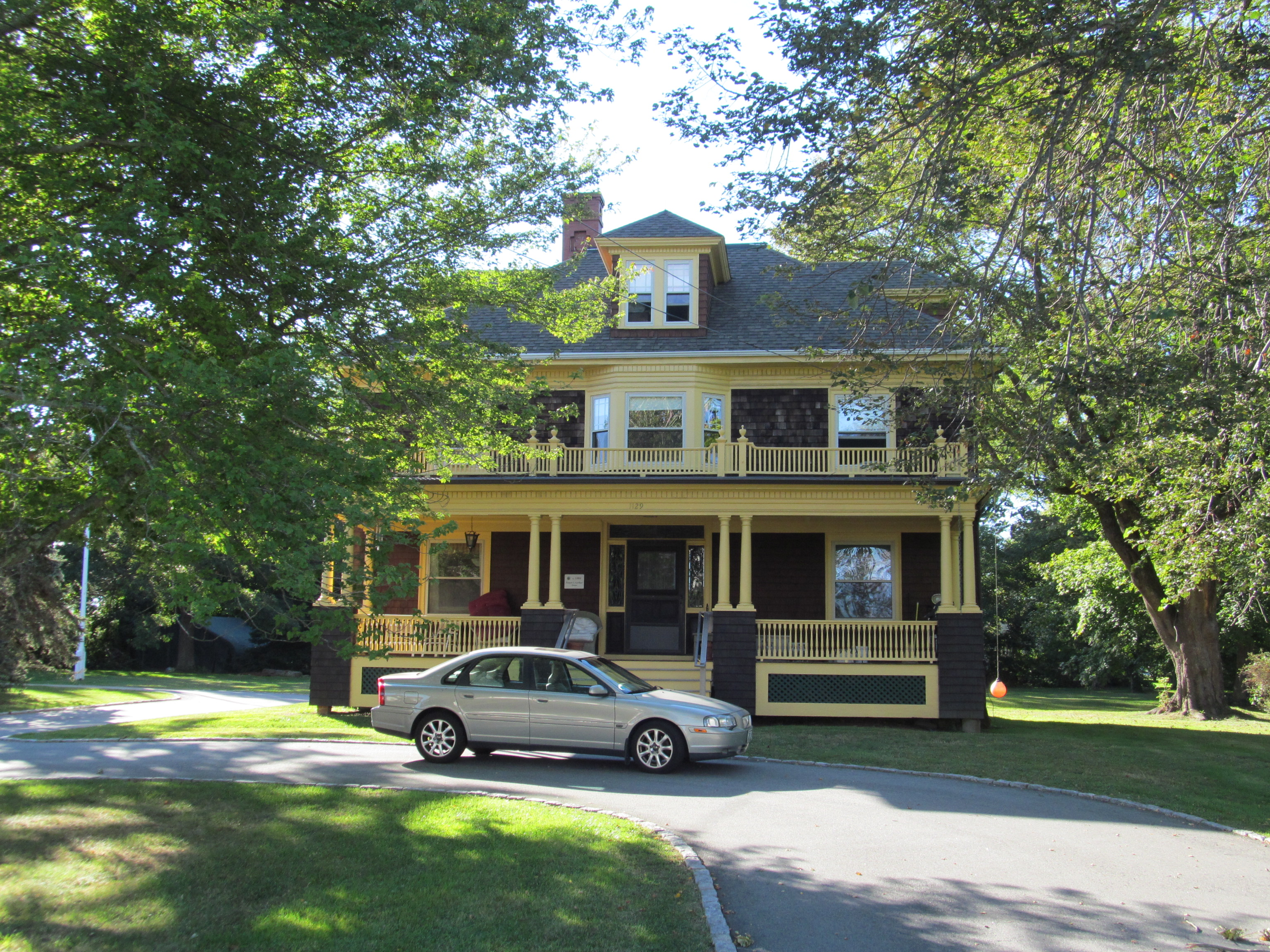
- Francis L. Gardner House

- Location within Massachusetts Location within the United States
- Location: 1129 Gardner's Neck Rd., Swansea, Massachusetts
- Coordinates: 41°43′15″N 71°12′9″W
- Built: 1903
- Architect: Marvell, Edward I.
- Architectural style: Colonial Revival
- MPS: Swansea MRA
- NRHP reference No.: 90000077
- Added to NRHP: February 16, 1990

The Francis L. Gardner House is a historic house at 1129 Gardner's Neck Road in Swansea, Massachusetts. The Colonial Revival house was built in 1903 for Francis Gardner, owner of a market garden farm on the site, and a local town selectman.

== Description and history ==
The Francis L. Gardner House is located on the west side of Gardner's Neck Road, roughly opposite Wilder Street. It is a roughly square 2 1/2-story wood-framed house, with a hip roof pierced by hip-roof dormers. It has a single-story porch extending across the front, supported by grouped columns, with a dentillated cornice and balcony rail above. A pair of brick chimneys have Tudor decoration. The main entrance door has leaded glass sidelight and transom windows. The interior has high-quality oak woodwork, and an oak fireplace with Italian tile. There is a bay window above the main entrance, and a two-story bay on the side.

The house was designed by Fall River architect Edward I. Marvell for Francis L. Gardner, a descendant of the Gardners for whom Gardner's Neck is named. Gardner's father Leland was a successful market gardner (a significant local industry), providing fresh produce to passenger ships at Fall River. This business was operated by Francis and his brother Chester until about 1925, when they began selling land off for development. Francis Gardner served as a town selectman for many years.

The house was listed on the National Register of Historic Places on February 16, 1990.

== See also ==
- National Register of Historic Places listings in Bristol County, Massachusetts
