= James Gardner House =

Historic house in Utah, United States

- U.S. National Register of Historic Places
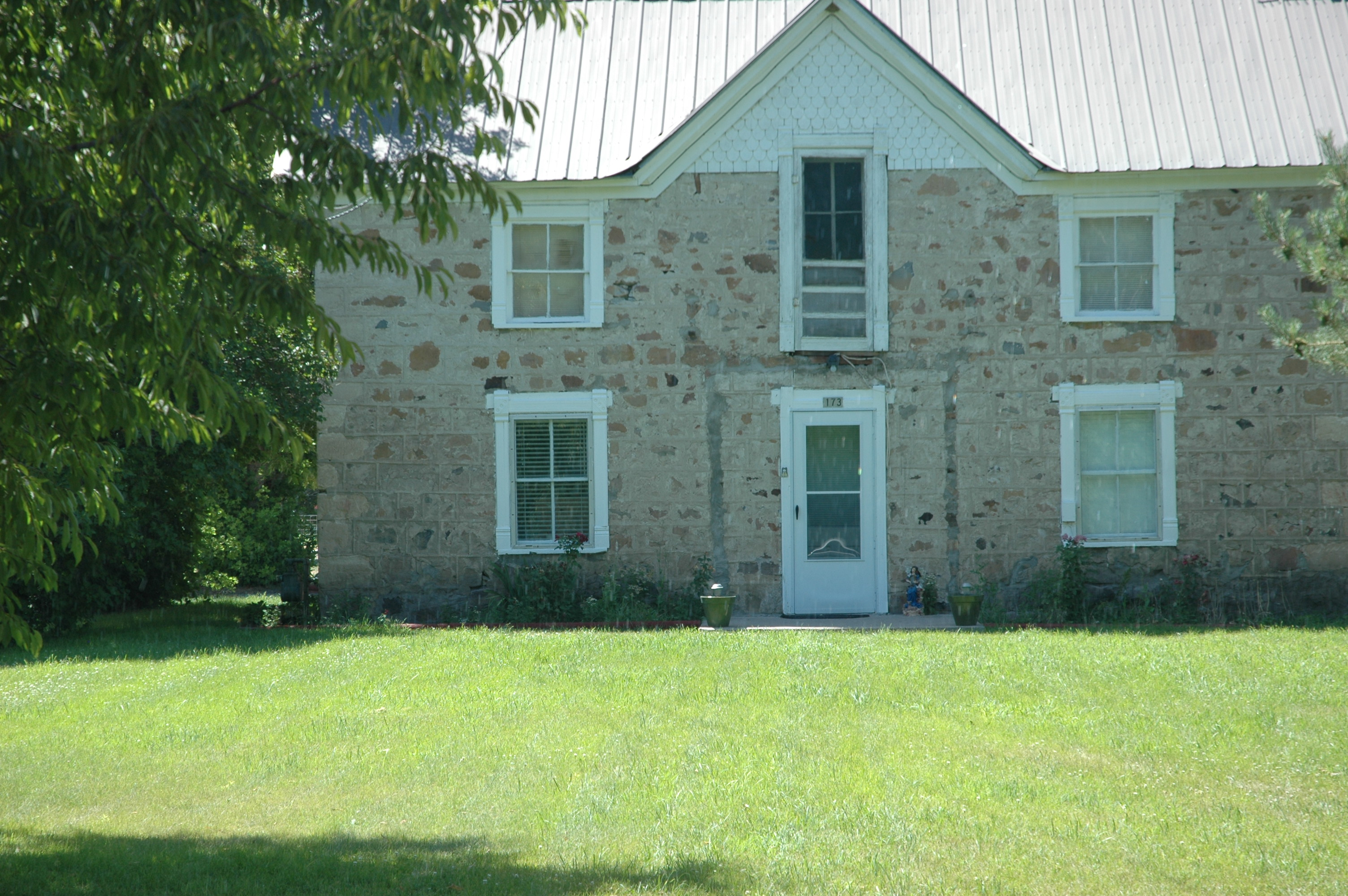

- Location within Utah Location within the United States
- Location: 173 N. Main St., Mendon, Utah
- Coordinates: 41°42′39″N 111°58′34″W
- Area: 1.3 acres (0.53 ha)
- Built: 1870, 1948
- NRHP reference No.: 82004111
- Added to NRHP: February 11, 1982

The James Gardner House, at 173 N. Main St. in Mendon, Utah, United States, was built in 1870. It was listed on the National Register of Historic Places in 1982.

It is a two-story hall and parlor plan house built of local sandstone. It may have been built by Robert Crookston, a Cache Valley stonemason. It was extended to the rear in 1948 by a lean-to addition.

It was built for James Garder, who was born in England in 1826 and immigrated with his wife and children in 1860. Gardner moved to Idaho in 1885.
