= Ira W. Gardner House =

Historic house in Utah, United States

- U.S. National Register of Historic Places
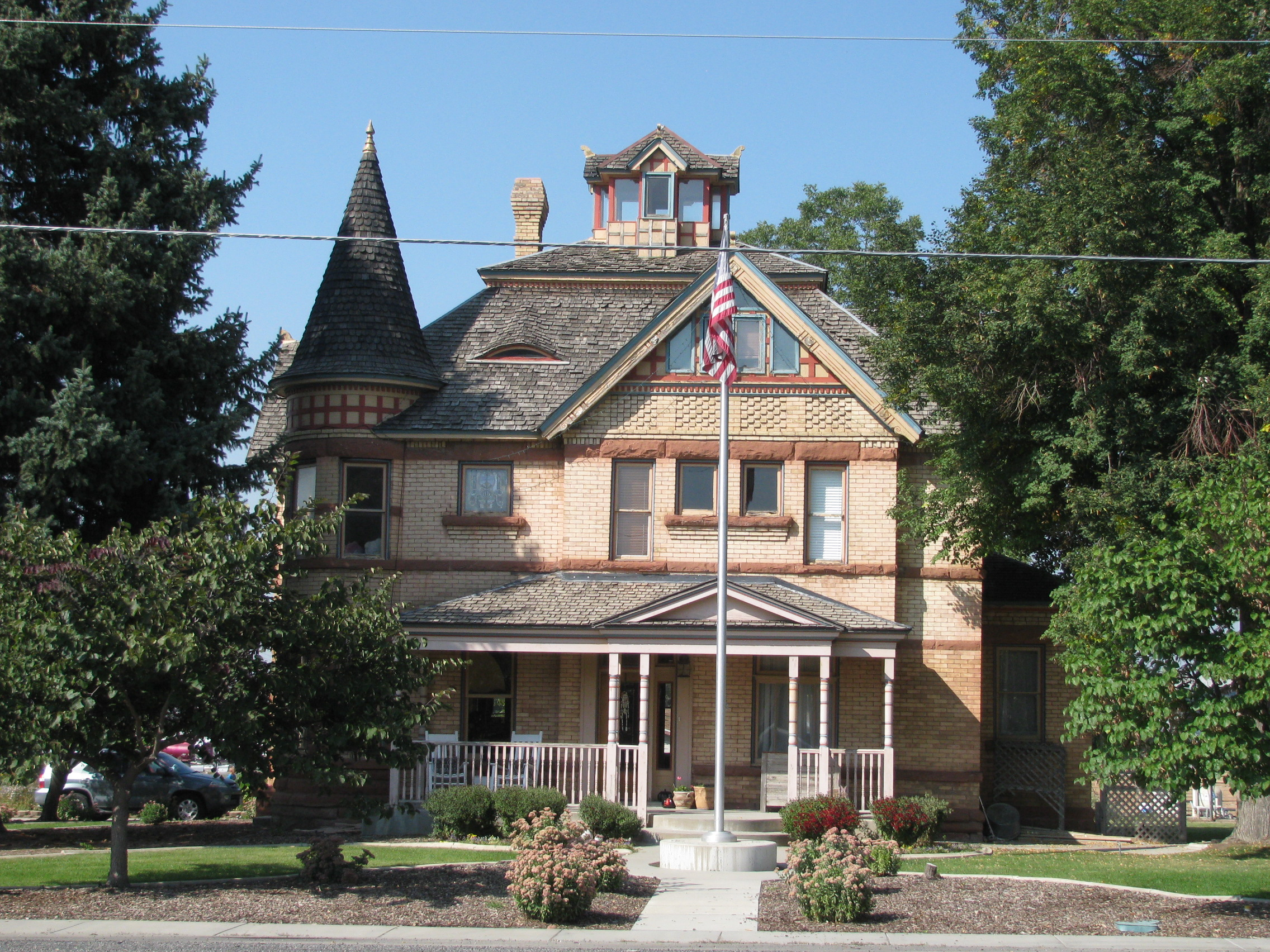
- The Ira W. Gardner House, September 2012

- Location within Utah Location within the United States
- Location: 15 East Center Street; Salem, Utah; United States
- Coordinates: 40°3′17″N 111°40′20″W
- Area: less than one acre
- Built: 1895
- Architect: Daniel M. Cummings
- Architectural style: Queen Anne
- NRHP reference No.: 77001323
- Added to NRHP: July 28, 1977

The Ira W. Gardner House is a historic house in Salem, Utah, United States was built in 1895. It was listed on the National Register of Historic Places (NRHP) in 1977.

According to its NRHP nomination "the Gardner Home is considered the town's landmark residence." The NRHP lists the address as 10 North Main Street, but the actual address of the property is 15 East Center Street.

== See also ==
- National Register of Historic Places listings in Utah County, Utah
