= Preserved Gardner House =

Historic house in Massachusetts, United States

- U.S. National Register of Historic Places
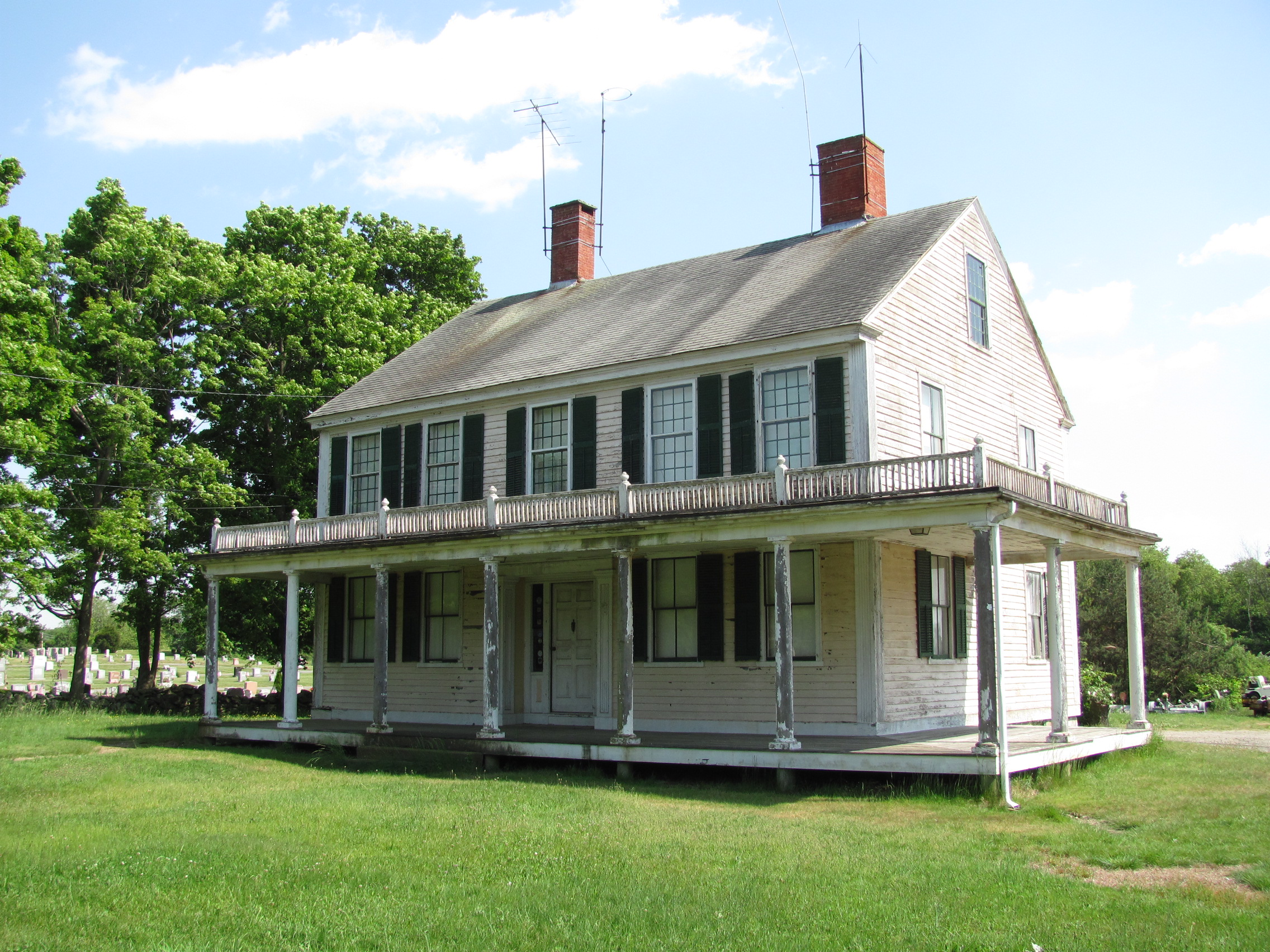
- Preserved Gardner House

- Location within Massachusetts Location within the United States
- Location: 90 Milford Rd., Swansea, Massachusetts
- Coordinates: 41°45′3″N 71°11′58″W
- Area: 2 acres (0.81 ha)
- Built: c. 1820
- Architectural style: Federal
- MPS: Swansea MRA
- NRHP reference No.: 90000061
- Added to NRHP: February 16, 1990

The Preserved Gardner House is a historic house located in Swansea, Massachusetts.

== Description and history ==
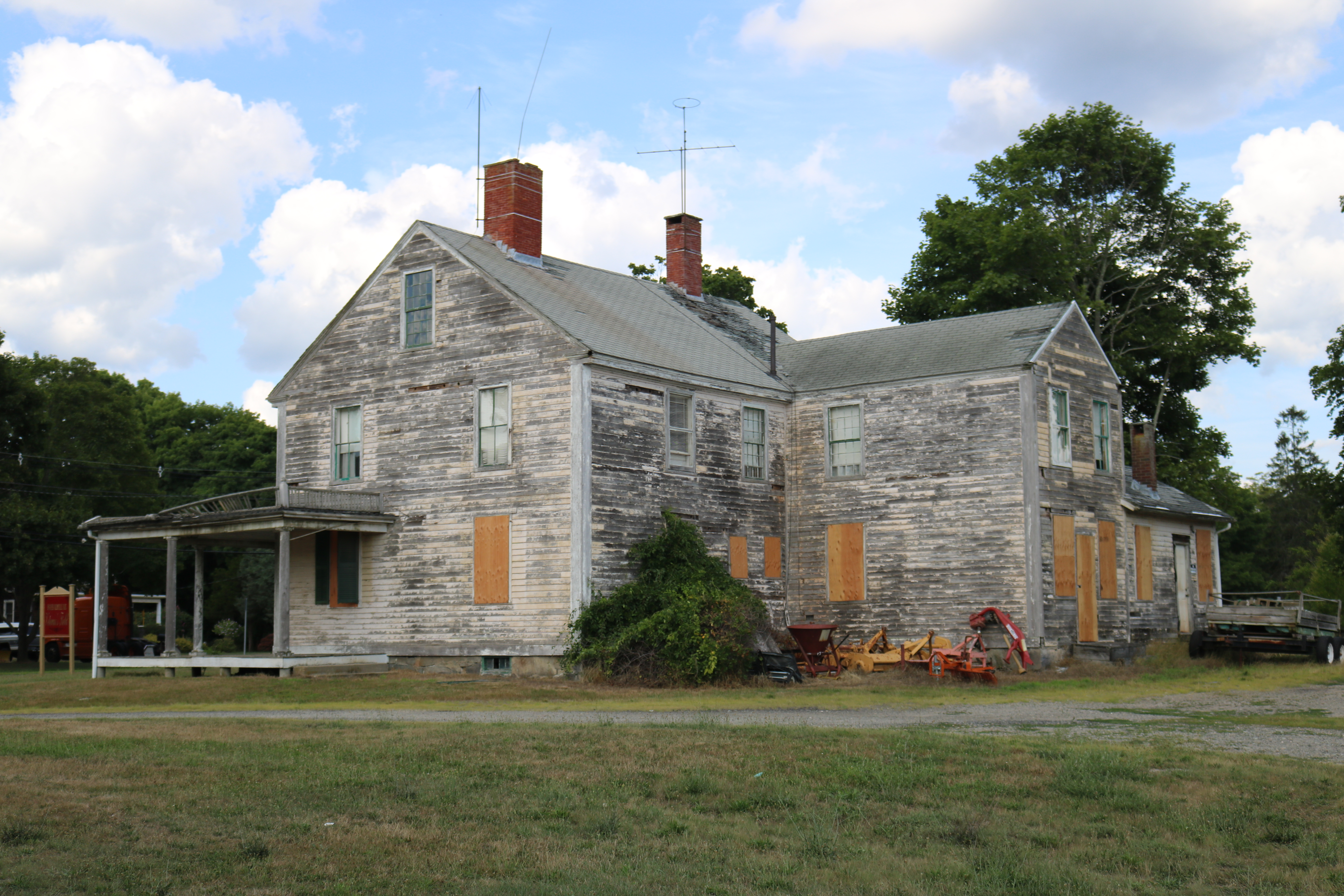
Preserved Gardner House, 2018

This 2 1/2-story, wood-framed house was built in about 1820, and is a good local example of a Federal style farmhouse. Its porches were added in the late 19th century, when the house was converted to a summer residence when Swansea became a fashionable summer resort area. The house and surrounding land were gifted to the town, which has developed much of the property as athletic fields. The house itself was reported in 2014 to be in deteriorating condition.

The house was listed on the National Register of Historic Places on February 16, 1990.

== See also ==
- National Register of Historic Places listings in Bristol County, Massachusetts
