= Joseph Gardner House =

Historic house in Massachusetts, United States

- U.S. National Register of Historic Places
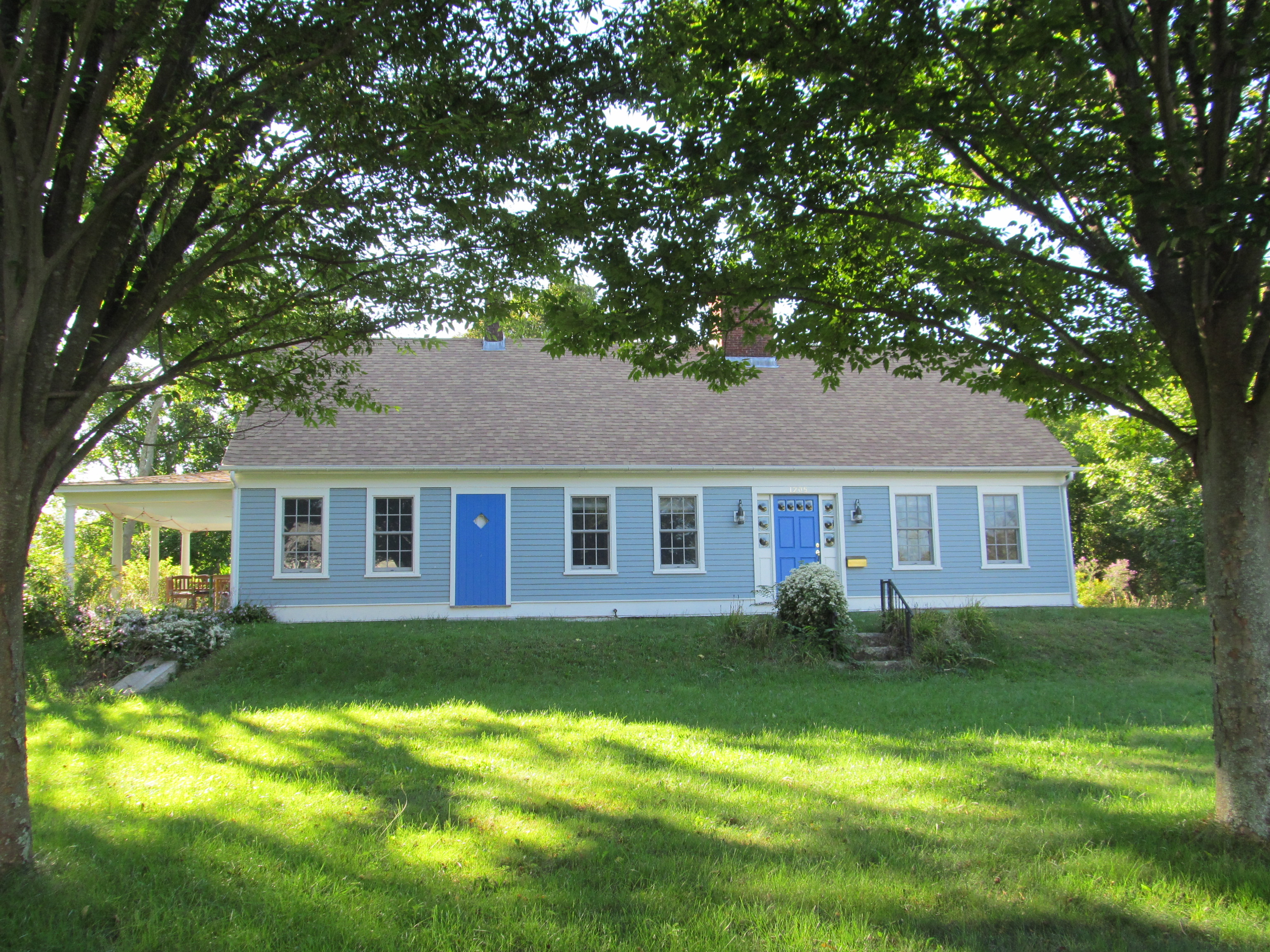
- Joseph Gardner House

- Location within Massachusetts Location within the United States
- Location: 1205 Gardner's Neck Road, Swansea, Massachusetts
- Coordinates: 41°43′7″N 71°12′15″W
- Built: 1795
- Architectural style: Federal
- MPS: Swansea MRA
- NRHP reference No.: 90000076
- Added to NRHP: February 16, 1990

The Joseph Gardner House is a historic house in Swansea, Massachusetts. The original five-bay block of this 1 1/2-story Cape style house was built c. 1795; it was expanded and converted for summer use c. 1877 during the rise of Gardner's Neck as a summer resort area. The Joseph Gardner, the builder was the grandson of Samuel Gardner, one of the early owners of the neck after its purchase from Native Americans.

The house was listed on the National Register of Historic Places in 1990.

== See also ==
- National Register of Historic Places listings in Bristol County, Massachusetts
