= State Street Baptist Church =

Historic church in Kentucky, United States

- First Colored Baptist Church
- U.S. National Register of Historic Places
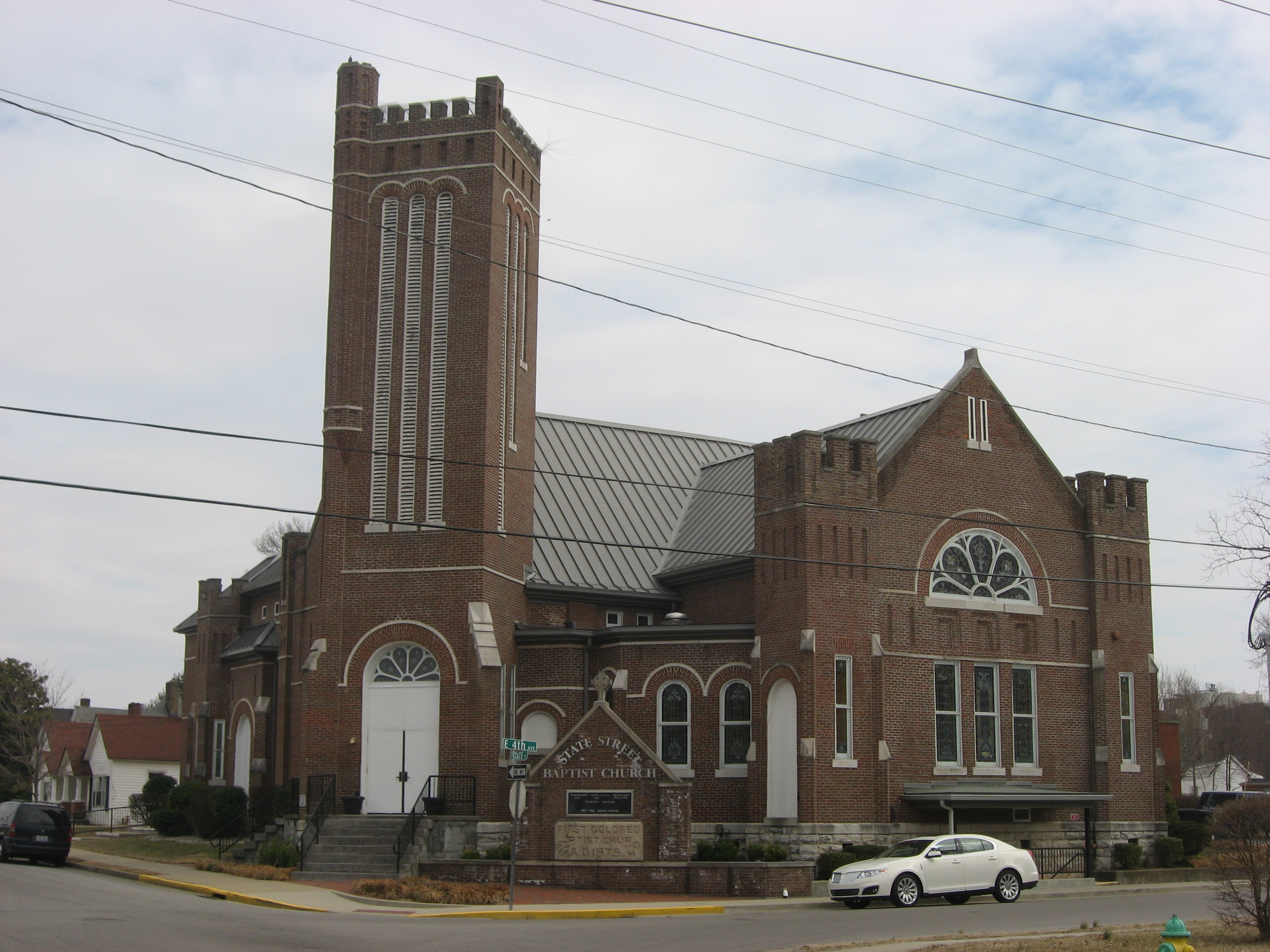
- Front and western side

- Location within Kentucky Location within the United States
- Location: 340 State St., Bowling Green, Kentucky
- Coordinates: 36°59′48″N 86°26′1″W
- Built: 1898
- Architectural style: Gothic Revival
- MPS: Warren County MRA
- NRHP reference No.: 79003524
- Added to NRHP: December 18, 1979

The State Street Baptist Church, formerly the First Colored Baptist Church, is a historic Baptist church at 340 State Street in Bowling Green, Kentucky. It was built in 1898 and added to the National Register of Historic Places in 1979.

The church was the first formally organized church for blacks in Bowling Green. It was formed in 1838 from slaves from the First Baptist Church. The present church building, built in 1898, is a 1 1/2-story brick Gothic Revival-style church with buttresses.
