= Robert W. Gardner House =

Historic building in Illinois, US

- U.S. National Register of Historic Places
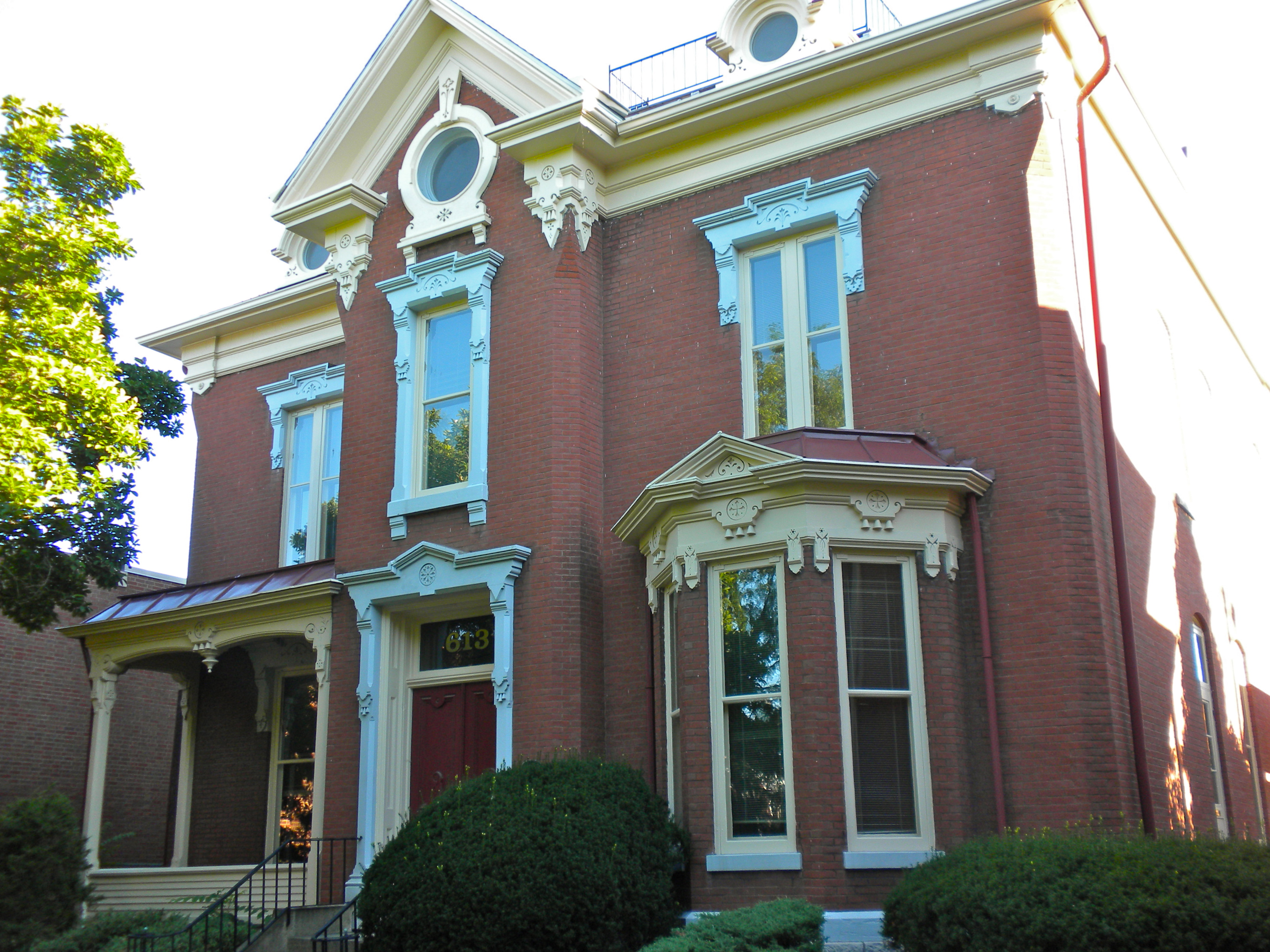

- Location within Illinois Location within the United States
- Location: 613 Broadway St., Quincy, Illinois
- Coordinates: 39°56′9″N 91°24′21″W
- Area: 0.3 acres (0.12 ha)
- Built: 1875
- Architectural style: Late Victorian
- NRHP reference No.: 79000812
- Added to NRHP: June 20, 1979

The Robert W. Gardner House in Quincy, Illinois, Adams County, is designed in the Second Empire style (along with a few elements common to Italianate style) and found its place among the locales on the National Register of Historic Places on April 20, 1979. Though the building was constructed in the later half of the 19th century, 1873, the architect as well as the builder are unknown. The interior woodwork, all original, has been fully restored including the walnut staircase. Gardner invented the speed governor used in steam engines and the Gardner Museum of Architecture and Design in Quincy is named for him.
