= Samuel Gardner House =

Historic house in Massachusetts, United States

- U.S. National Register of Historic Places
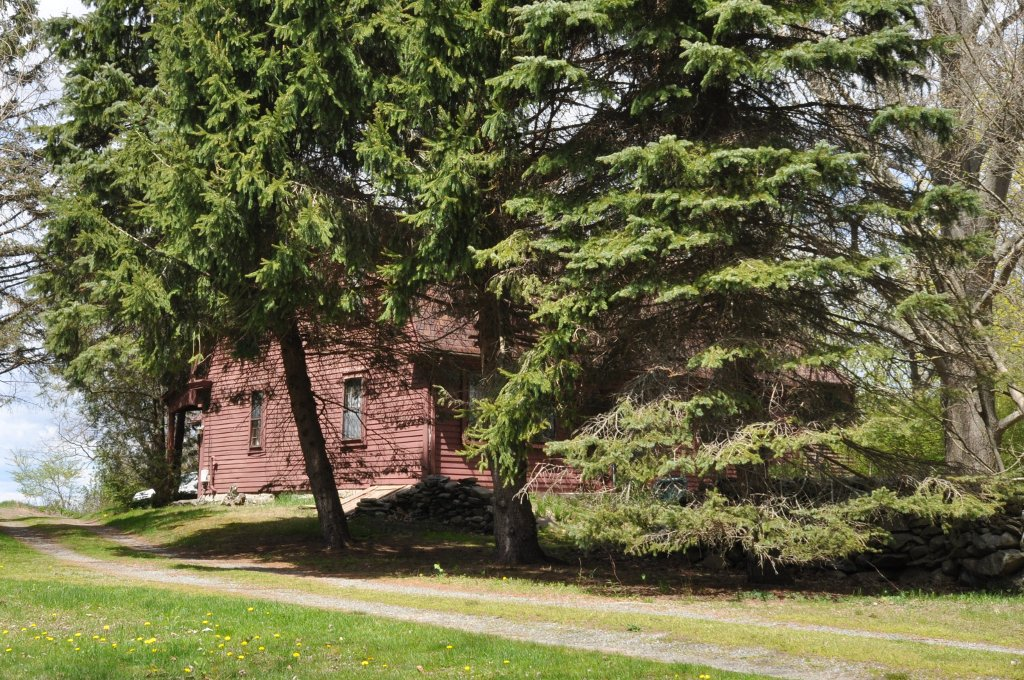

- Location within Massachusetts Location within the United States
- Location: 1035 Gardner's Neck Road, Swansea, Massachusetts
- Coordinates: 41°43′22″N 71°12′8″W
- Built: 1768
- Architectural style: Georgian
- MPS: Swansea MRA
- NRHP reference No.: 90000068
- Added to NRHP: February 16, 1990

The Samuel Gardner House is a historic colonial American house in Swansea, Massachusetts. This 1 1/2-story wood frame gambrel-roofed house was built c. 1768 by Samuel Gardner, whose father (also named Samuel) was the first English colonist to settle Gardner's Neck after its purchase from local Native Americans. It is a well-preserved 18th century farmhouse.

The house was listed on the National Register of Historic Places in 1990.

== See also ==
- National Register of Historic Places listings in Bristol County, Massachusetts
