= Gardner–Mays Cottage =

Historic house in Virginia, United States

- U.S. National Register of Historic Places
- U.S. Historic district – Contributing property
- Virginia Landmarks Register
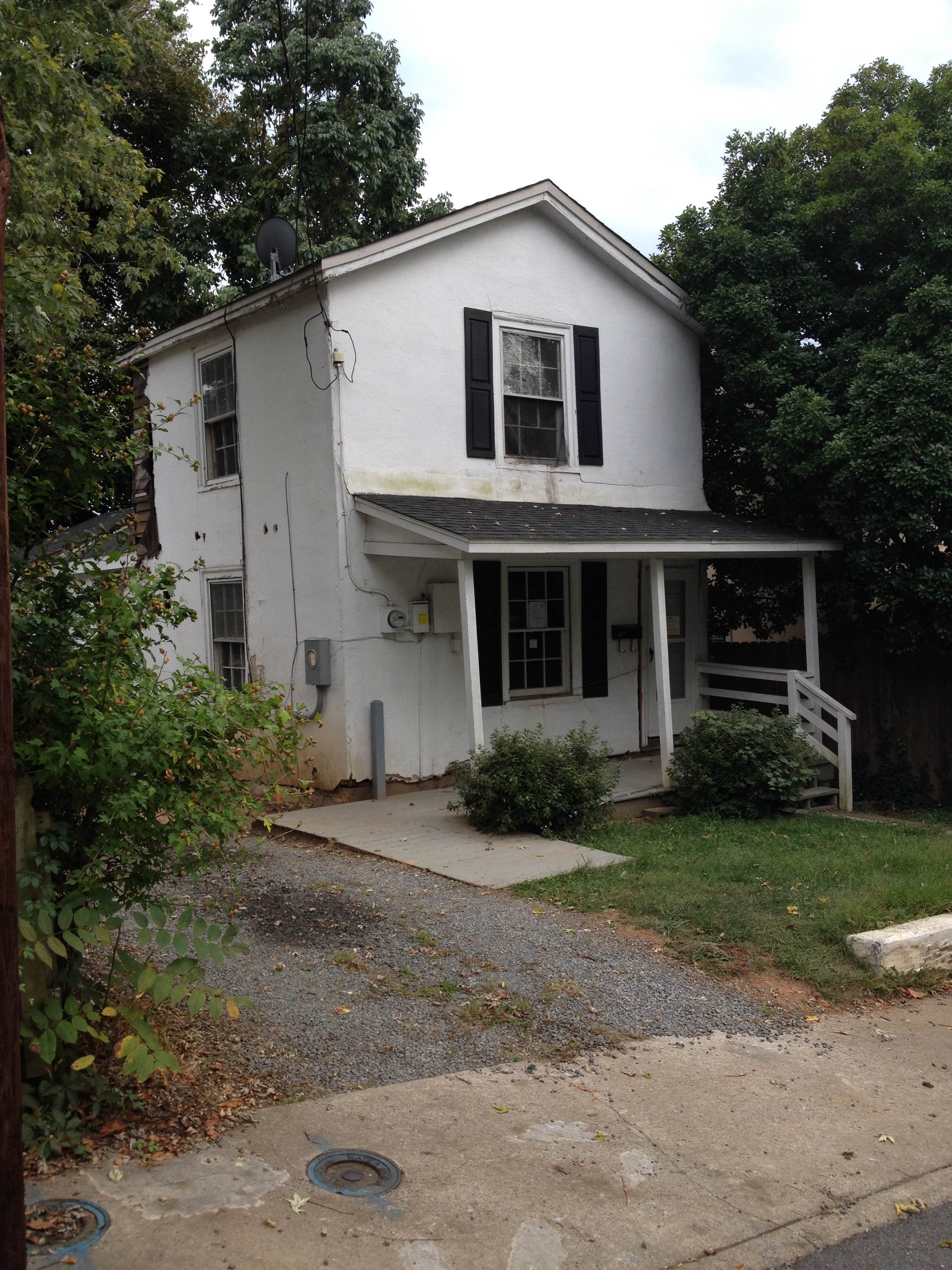

- Location within Virginia Location within the United States
- Location: 1022 Grove St., Charlottesville, Virginia
- Coordinates: 38°1′44″N 78°29′56″W
- Area: less than one acre
- Built: 1891
- Part of: Fifeville and Tonsler Neighborhoods Historic District (ID09000452)
- MPS: Charlottesville MRA
- NRHP reference No.: 82001806
- VLR No.: 104-0245

Significant dates
- Added to NRHP: October 21, 1982
- Designated CP: June 18, 2009
- Designated VLR: October 20, 1981

Gardner–Mays Cottage is a historic home located at Charlottesville, Virginia. It was built in 1891, and is a one-over-one-room stucco cottage on a low foundation with an original one-room rear wing. The house is typical of the many small worker's cottages built in Fifeville.

It was listed on the National Register of Historic Places in 1982. It is located in the Fifeville and Tonsler Neighborhoods Historic District.
