= Isaac Gardner Sr. House =

Historic house in Florida, United States

- U.S. National Register of Historic Places
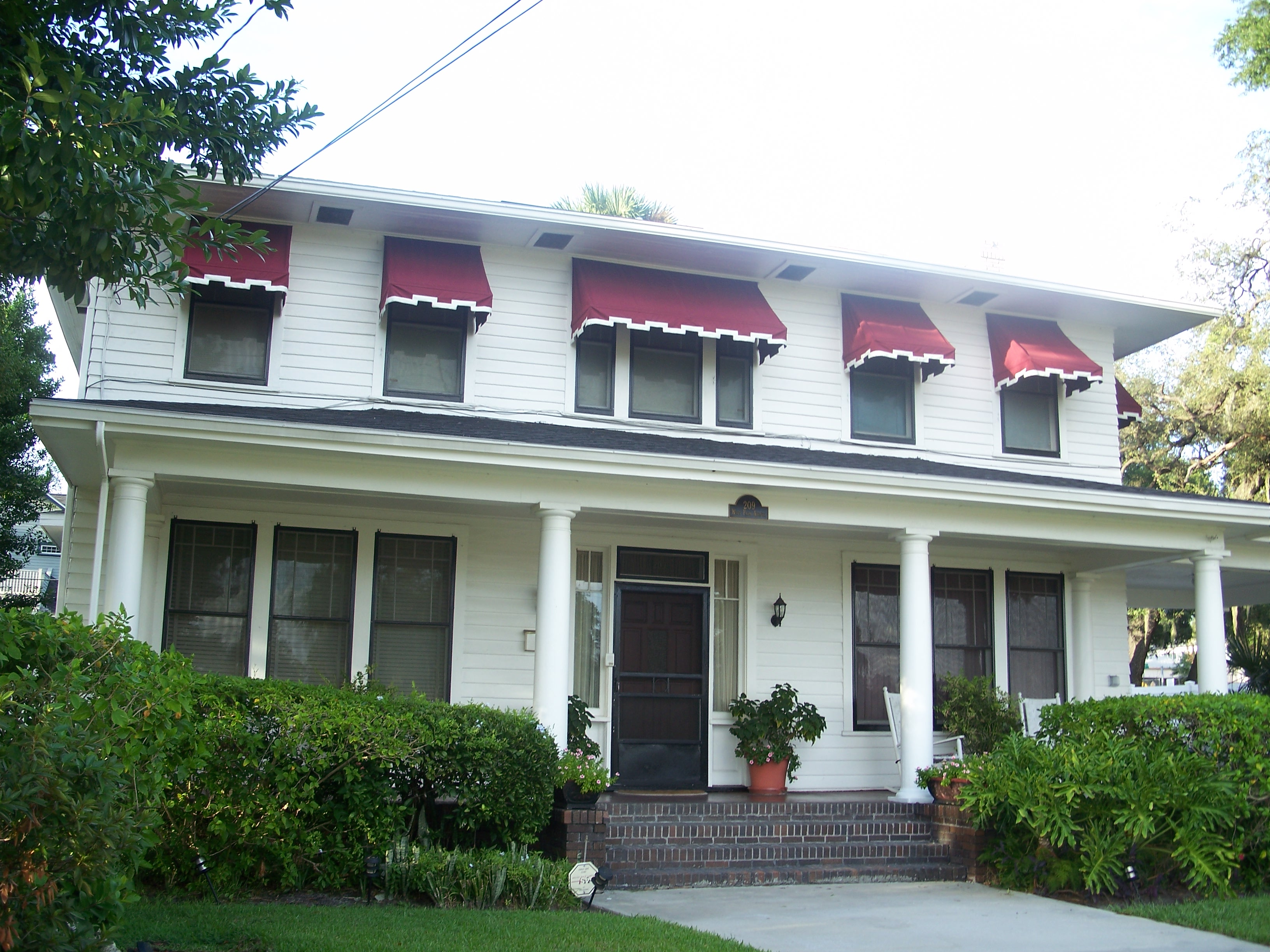

- Location within Florida Location within the United States
- Location: 209 W. Palm Ave., Tampa, Florida
- Coordinates: 27°57′51″N 82°27′47″W
- Built: 1924
- Architect: R. B. Gambier
- Architectural style: Colonial Revival
- NRHP reference No.: 03001013
- Added to NRHP: October 13, 2003

The Isaac Gardner Sr. House (also known as the Gardner Family House) is a historic home in Tampa, Florida, United States. It is located at 209 West Palm Avenue. On October 13, 2003, it was added to the U.S. National Register of Historic Places.
